= 8th Streamy Awards =

2018 awards ceremony recognizing online video

- Date: October 22, 2018
- Location: The Beverly Hilton, Beverly Hills, California
- Presented by: Streamys Blue Ribbon Panel
- Hosted by: The Try Guys

Highlights
- Most awards: Shane Dawson (3)
- Most nominations: David Dobrik (6)
- Audience Choice: The Try Guys (Show of the Year); Shane Dawson (Creator of the Year)

Television/radio coverage
- Network: YouTube
- Viewership: 6.9 million
- Produced by: Dick Clark Productions; Tubefilter

The 8th Annual Streamy Awards was the eighth installment of the Streamy Awards honoring the best in American streaming television series and their creators. The ceremony was broadcast live on YouTube on October 22, 2018, from The Beverly Hilton in Beverly Hills, California. They were hosted by The Try Guys.

On October 9, 2018, the 1st annual Streamys Brand Awards were held during the IAB Digital Content NewFronts West at NeueHouse Hollywood and hosted by Alisha Marie and Remi Cruz. The awards honored notable achievements in digital marketing. On October 18, 2018, the 2nd annual Purpose Awards @ The Streamys were held, hosted by Jay Shetty. The awards recognized digital creators, brands, and nonprofits who have used their influence for a greater good.

== Performers ==
The 8th Annual Streamy Awards featured the following musical performances:

Performers at the 8th Streamy Awards
Artist(s)	Song(s)
Montell Jordan	"This Is How We Do It"

== Winners and nominees ==
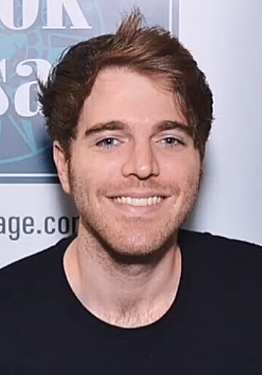
Shane Dawson, winner of Audience Choice Award for Creator of the Year and two other awards for his documentary The Truth About Tanacon

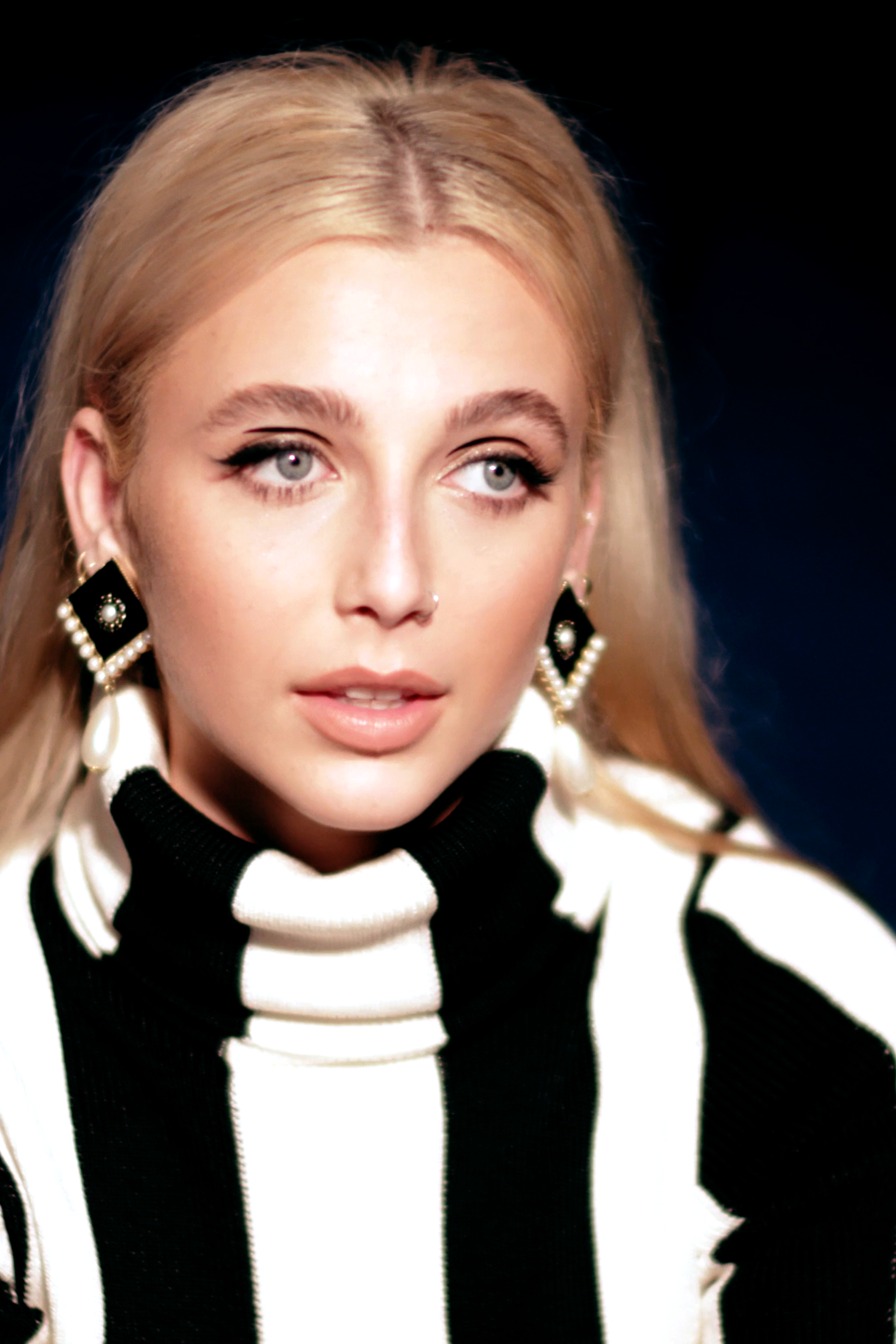
Emma Chamberlain, winner of the Breakout Creator award

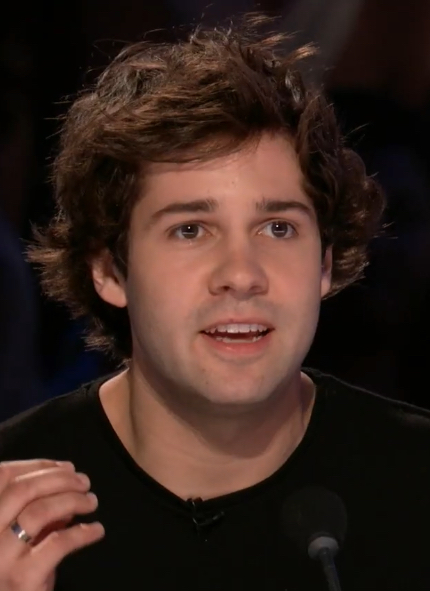
David Dobrik, winner of the First Person category and Best Ensemble Cast for his vlog

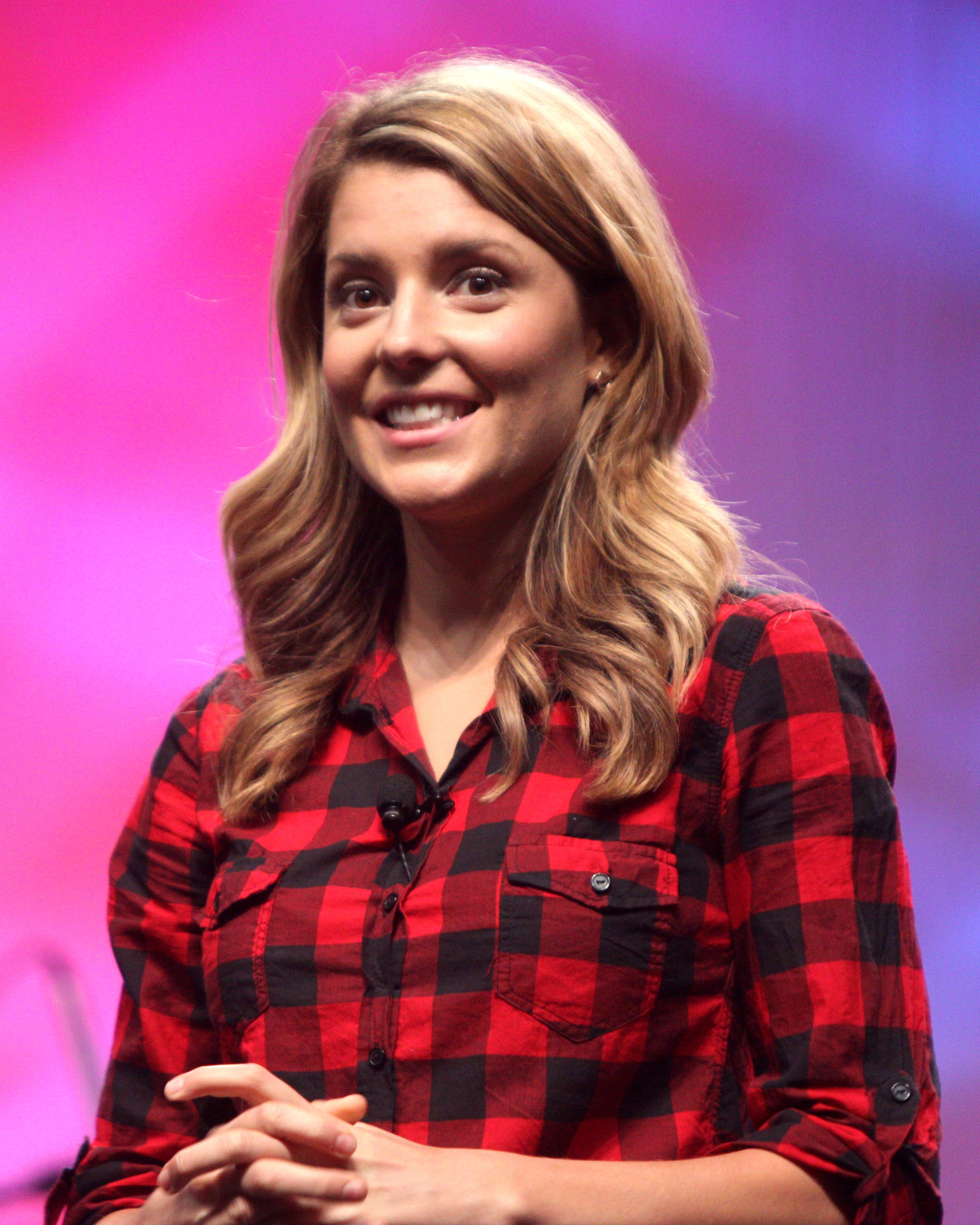
Grace Helbig, winner of Best Podcast

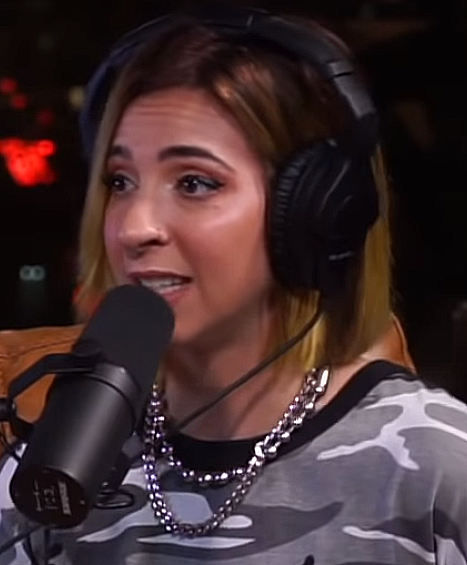
Gabbie Hanna, winner of the Social Video Storyteller award

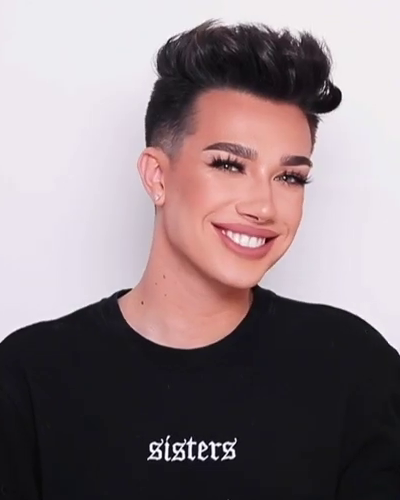
James Charles, winner of the Beauty category

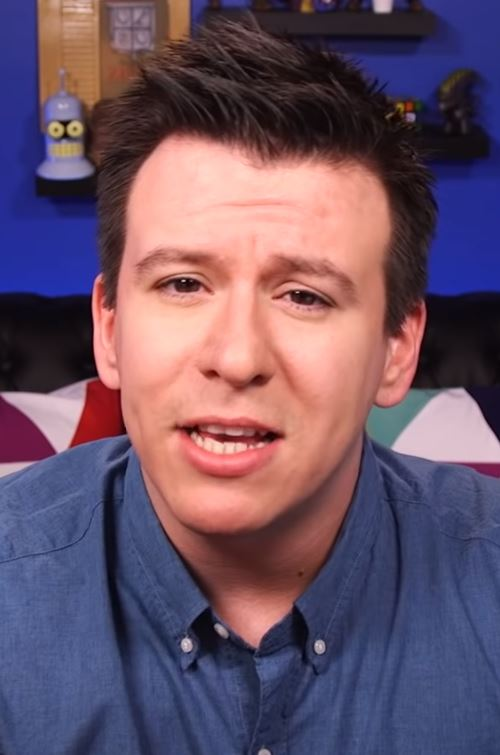
Philip DeFranco, winner of the News category

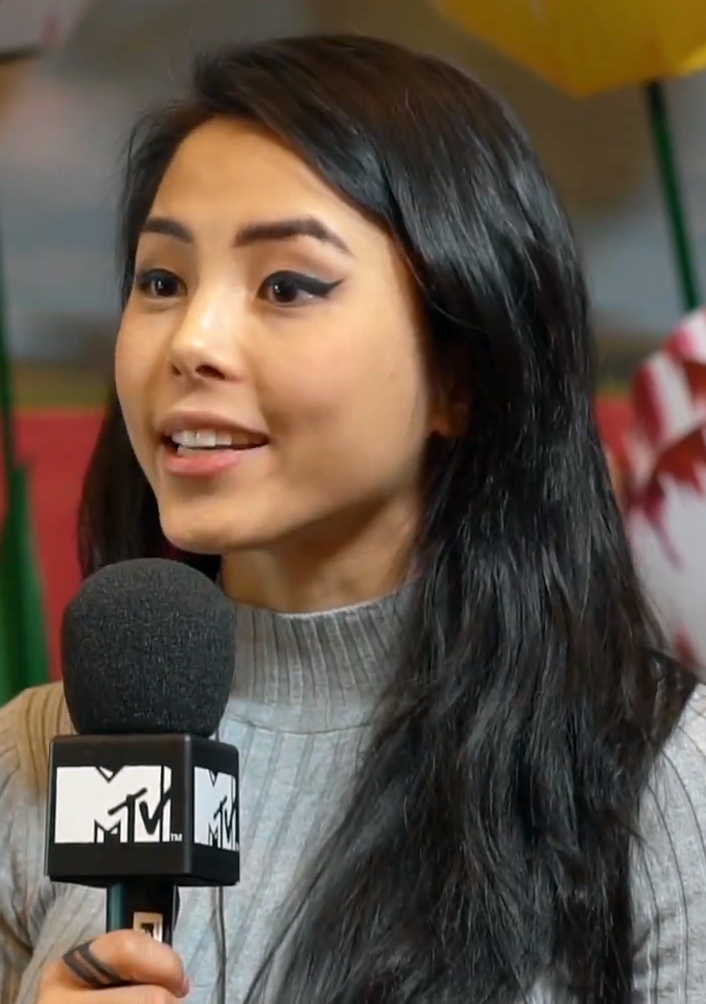
Anna Akana, winner of Best Acting in a Drama

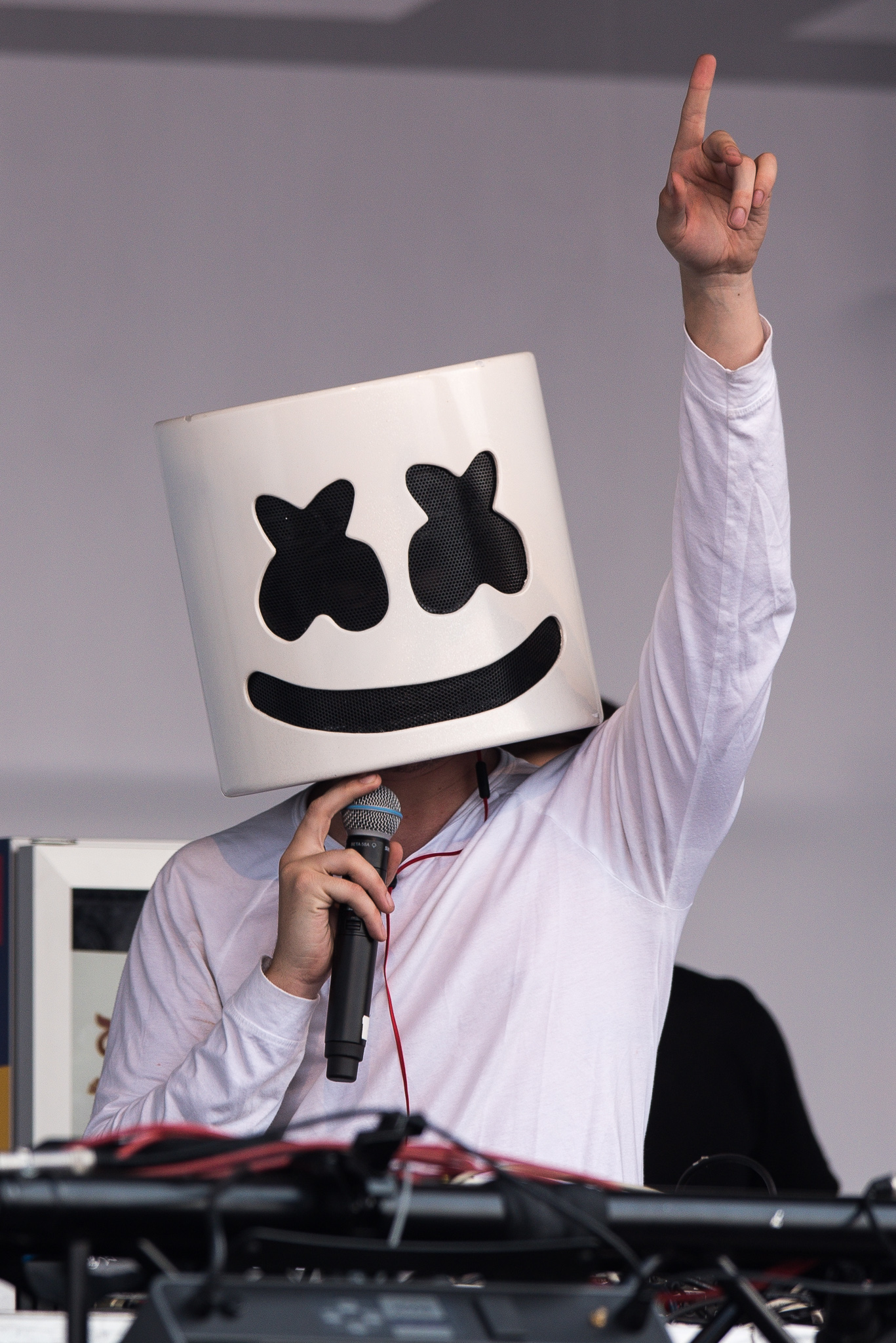
Marshmello, winner of Breakthrough Artist

The nominees were announced on September 25, 2018. 24 of the awards were announced on October 20 at the Streamy Premiere Awards in Santa Monica, hosted by BlameItOnKway and Montana Tucker. The remaining awards were announced at the main ceremony at the Beverly Hilton on October 22. Among the awards presented at the ceremony was the first ever Milk-Bone Dog of the Year Honor, which was voted for by fans and presented by Gus Kenworthy. Winners of the categories were selected by the Streamys Blue Ribbon Panel except for the Audience Choice and Dog of the Year awards which were put to a public vote.

Winners are listed first, in bold.

OVERALL
Audience Choice Award for Show of the Year	Audience Choice Award for Creator of the Year
**The Try Guys**; Blippi; Escape the Night; F2 Finding Football; Good Mythical Morning; The Philip DeFranco Show; REACT; Rooster Teeth; Yappie; The Young Turks	**Shane Dawson**; Andrei Terbea; Casey Neistat; David Dobrik; Dolan Twins; Emma Chamberlain; Gabbie Hanna; Liza Koshy; Ninja; Safiya Nygaard
International	Breakout Creator
**Pautips**; Alex French Guy Cooking; Calle y Poché; Fozi Mozi; Sebastian Villalobos	**Emma Chamberlain**; Bretman Rock; Dobre Brothers; Elle Mills; Ninja
Action or Sci-Fi	Animated
**Two Sentence Horror Stories**; ATROPA; Day 5; Lifeline; The Look-See	**storybooth**; Andrei Terbea; Bravest Warriors; Jaiden Animations; TheOdd1sOut
Comedy	Documentary
**Brandon Rogers**; Hannah Stocking; Jenna Marbles; Jack Douglass; Lilly Singh	**The Truth About Tanacon**; 60 Second Docs; Extraordinary People; MEL Films; The Mortified Guide
First Person	Immersive
**David Dobrik**; Alex Wassabi; Casey Neistat; Emma Chamberlain; Gabbie Hanna	**Find Me – BlackBoxTV**; Comic Book Portal – CyreneQ; Life Support – Taryn Southern; Tiny Tank – SoKrispyMedia; Welcome to Everlock – Escape the Night
Podcast	Dog of the Year
**Not Too Deep with Grace Helbig**; Couples Therapy with Candice & Casey; Ear Biscuits with Rhett & Link; H3 Podcast; VIEWS with David Dobrik and Jason Nash	**Todd the Hero Dog**; Louboutina the Hugging Dog; Pierre Don't Care
SOCIAL VIDEO
Live Streamer	Storyteller
**Ninja**; Critical Role; Myth; Nickmercs; Pokimane	**Gabbie Hanna**; Amanda Cerny; Jeffree Star; Shay Mitchell; Tana Mongeau
SERIES
Comedy Series	Drama Series
**Liza on Demand**; Anime Crimes Division; Escape the Night; Grown; Rhett and Link's Buddy System	**Giants**; Caught; Chicken Girls; Simi Valley; Youth & Consequences
Indie Series	Non-fiction Series
**the T**; Brujos; Lovers Divided; Twenty The Webseries; Yappie	**Hot Ones**; I Have A Secret; MK ULTRA; Red Table Talk; Roman Atwood's Day Dreams
SUBJECT AWARDS
Beauty	Dance
**James Charles**; Huda Kattan; Jeffree Star; Patrick Starrr; Safiya Nygaard	**Matt Steffanina**; 1MILLION Dance Studio; Dytto; Kaycee Rice; Kyle Hanagami
Fashion	Food
**Niki and Gabi**; Cheap Thrills with Tabasko Sweet; IAMKARENO; Koleen Diaz; TheNotoriousKIA	**Worth It**; Binging with Babish; Cooking with Marshmello; Gourmet Makes; The Icing Artist
Gaming	Health and Wellness
**Ninja**; FaZe Clan; Markiplier; PrestonPlayz; Typical Gamer	**Jay Shetty**; Buff Dudes; Doctor Mike; How to ADHD; Kati Morton
Kids and Family	Lifestyle
**Guava Juice**; Blippi; Collins Key; ChuChu TV; Ryan ToysReview	**Merrell Twins**; Brooklyn and Bailey; Eva Gutowski; Jess and Gabriel; Mr. Kate
News	Pop Culture
**The Philip DeFranco Show**; AM to DM by BuzzFeed News; The Breakdown; NowThis News; The Young Turks	**Vogue's 73 Questions**; Do They Know It?; Game Theory; Sneaker Shopping; Super Carlin Brothers
Science or Education	Sports
**Marques Brownlee**; AsapSCIENCE; The King of Random; Mark Rober; Nas Daily	**Cold As Balls**; Donut Media; F2 Finding Football; Kevin Durant; WWE Mixed Match Challenge
PERFORMANCE
Acting in a Comedy	Acting in a Drama
**Liza Koshy – Liza on Demand**; Arden Rose – Mr. Student Body President; Melvin Gregg – God's Son; Nate Contreras – Cheap Thrills with Tabasko Sweet; SungWon Cho – Anime Crimes Division	**Anna Akana – Youth & Consequences**; Annie LeBlanc – Chicken Girls; DeStorm Power – Caught; James Bland – Giants; Jesse Ridgway – My Virtual Escape
Collaboration	Ensemble Cast
**Kandee Johnson and Kim Kardashian – Princess Jasmine Transformation**; David Dobrik and Jennifer Lopez – FEAR BOX Challenge; Lilly Singh and Will Smith – How To Speak Internet 101; Miranda Sings and Sofie Dossi – Becoming A Contortionist!; Shane Dawson and Molly Burke – Switching Lives With A Blind Person	**David's Vlog**; Caught; Escape the Night; Ladylike; The Try Guys
MUSIC
Breakthrough Artist	Cover Song
**Marshmello**; Big Shaq; Greta Van Fleet; Jaden Smith; Two Feet	**Walk off the Earth – "Girls Like You" (Maroon 5)**; Greta Van Fleet – "Rolling In The Deep" (Adele); James Bay – "Delicate" (Taylor Swift); Leroy Sanchez – "Havana" (Camila Cabello); Morgan Saint – "Thru Your Phone" (Cardi B)
CRAFT AWARDS
Directing	Writing
**Jesse Ridgway – My Virtual Escape**; David Dobrik – David's Vlog; Hazel Hayes – PrankMe; Jack Ferry – Mr. Student Body President; Wesley "Wuz Good" Armstrong – Couples Night	**DeStorm Power – Caught**; Deja Harrell – Seeds; Ezra Ani – Pillow Talk; Melvin Gregg – God's Son; Ry Doon, Luke Flipp, and Marion Webb – The Lab Ratz
Cinematography	Editing
**Joe Sabia – Vogue's 73 Questions**; Adam Tash – The Super Slow Show; Casey Neistat – Casey Neistat; Eric Foster, Kyle LaBrache, and Maris Lidaka – Paper Tigers; Greg Cotten – ATROPA	**Shane Dawson and Andrew Siwicki – The Truth About Tanacon**; Lee Black, Ronnie Edwards, Alexander Sedgewick, Daniel Seibert, and Thomas Torbergsen – Game Theory; Casey Neistat – Casey Neistat; Emma Chamberlain – Emma Chamberlain; TJ Nordaker and Kevin Williamsen – Honest Trailers
Costume Design	Visual and Special Effects
**Olivia Hines – Escape the Night**; Brandon Rogers – Magic Funhouse!; Jennifer Newman – Miss 2059; Samantha Burkhart – Lindsey Stirling; Ron Leaman – Automata	**Tobias Richter and Ryan Wieber – ATROPA**; Jody Steel – Body Art with Jody Steel; Sam Wickert – SoKrispyMedia; Tony E. Valenzuela – Find Me; Zach King – Zach King

=== Brand Awards ===
The first annual Streamys Brand Awards were presented at a separate event hosted by Alisha Marie and Remi Cruz at NeueHouse Hollywood on October 9, 2018, during the IAB Digital Content NewFronts West. Winners are listed first, in bold.

BRAND AWARDS
Branded Content: Series	Branded Content: Video
**Kevin Hart: Lyft Legend – Lyft Entertainment, Hartbeat Productions, Free Period Productions, Pygmy Wolf Productions in association with Lionsgate**; Guilty Party – AT&T Hello Lab, Fullscreen; Snoop Dogg's Hot Box Office – Universal Pictures, Paramount Pictures, 20th Century Fox, Viacom Velocity	**Upside Down Cooking Challenge: Giant Burrito – Glad, Portal A. Google**; The Dodo x Samsung Galaxy S9 Slow-Mo – Samsung, Group Nine Media; Sponsoring "Olympians" – Planet Fitness, Hill Holliday, Trilia Media
Honorable Mentions: Club Mickey Mouse – HP, Disney Digital Network; Couchland – Amazon Fire TV, Mekanism + Epic Signal; NowThis x Samsung Gear 360 – Samsung, Group Nine Media; Science and Star Wars – IBM, Disney, Lucasfilm; We Got You: Philly – Visit Philadelphia	Honorable Mentions: Dance Cleaning Challenge – Pine Sol, Studio Superba; Ellen Scares the Kit Kats Out of Her Audience – Kit Kat, The Ellen DeGeneres Show, Universal McCann Worldwide Inc, The Hershey Company; Simone Giertz x Westworld – HBO, Portal A, Google; "Stick Around" – GIPHY; We Travel To Kenya To Learn About The First Woman In History – 23andMe, BuzzFeed
Emerging Platform	Influencer Campaign
**Sissy That Bot, RuPaul's Drag Race – VH1, Facebook Messenger, The Bot Platform, Viacom**; Alaska Airlines GIPHY Brand Channel – Alaska Airlines, GIPHY, Mekanism + Epic Signal; Hey Google, Play... – Disney Digital Network, Google Home	**New Year, New Me | Rudy Mancuso & Stephen Curry – Brita, Portal A, Google**; NYE with Planet Fitness and Doug the Pug – Planet Fitness, Hill Holliday, Trilia Media; Seize the Awkward – Ad Council, American Foundation for Suicide Prevention, The JED Foundation
Honorable Mentions: Dockers Presents: The Interview Live! – Dockers, Facebook Live, Mekanism + Epic Signal, Levi Strauss & Co.; #FreeMurdoc, Gorillaz – Warner Bros. Records, Amazon Alexa, Parlophone Records, Eleven Manangement, Imperson; IGN Far Cry 5: Choose Your Own Adventure – Ubisoft Far Cry 5, Snapchat, Instagram, IGN Branded Entertainment Team; Screens Up – Nickelodeon	Honorable Mentions: EA Play Creators Cup – EA, Branded Entertainment Network; DIRECTV NOW Super Saturday Night with Jennifer Lopez #JLoNOW – DIRECTV NOW, Fullscreen, AT&T Hello Lab; The Walking Dead: No Man’s Land with Lele Pons, Anwar Jibawi, & Rudy Mancuso – The Walking Dead, Mediakix, Shots Studios

=== Purpose Awards ===
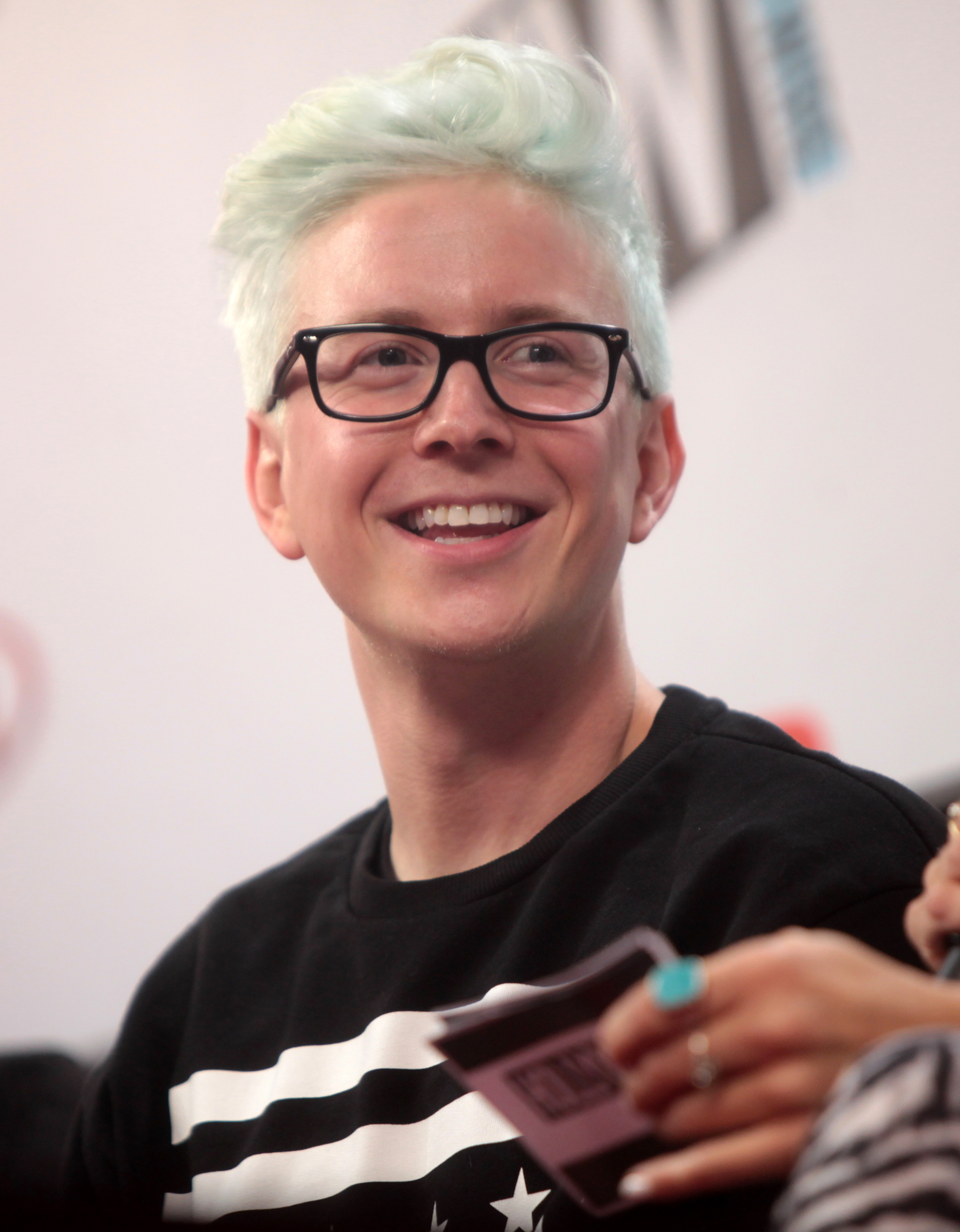
Tyler Oakley, winner of the Legacy Award at the Streamy Purpose Awards

The second annual Purpose Awards were presented at a separate event hosted by Jay Shetty on October 18, 2018. The awards were followed by a Creator Summit which featured panels in which creators discussed mental health and suicide prevention. Purpose Award honorees are listed in bold.

Creator Award	**Mike Rowe**; **Molly Burke**; **Shalom Blac**
Company or Brand Award	**The Dodo**; **GoFundMe**; **Walgreens, Red Nose Day**
Nonprofit or NGO Award	**Peacemaker Corps Association – Peace in the Streets**; **Special Books by Special Kids**; **Thirst Project**
Campaign Award	**Extra Life, Team Rooster Teeth – Children's Miracle Network Hospitals**; **MTV – Parkland Response**; **YouTube – Creators for Change**
Uniter Award	**One Million Acts of Good – Ellen DeGeneres – Cheerios**
Legacy Award	**Tyler Oakley**

== Reception ==
Kathryn Lindsay of Refinery29 praised the diversity of nominees for the awards. PinkNews, Pride.com, and Gay Star News highlighted YouTuber Anna Akana's acceptance speech in which she came out as a queer woman. The event had an increased livestream viewership of 73% compared with the previous year.
