= James Bland (actor) =

US American actor, writer

- Born: November 15, 1985 (age 40); Los Angeles, California, U.S.
- Occupations: Actor, writer, director, producer
- Years active: 2017–present
- Notable work: Giants
- Website: james-bland.com

James Bland (born November 15, 1985) is an American actor, writer, director, and producer based in Los Angeles, California. He is known for his work on the web series Giants.

== Career ==
=== Giants ===
Bland created, writes, produces, and stars in the web series Giants alongside Sean Samuels and Vanessa Baiden. After writing the first season, Bland created an Indiegogo campaign to crowdfund the series. Issa Rae and actor Jussie Smollett subsequently came on board as executive producers. The series premiered on Rae's YouTube channel on January 25, 2017. A second season premiered on the same channel in 2018. Giants has since been acquired and released for streaming on BET+.

Bland worked on several other series before writing Giants, and following the success of Rae's Awkward Black Girl, he felt inspired to make his own series. Giants has won numerous accolades. In 2018, the series won the award for Best Drama Series at the 8th annual Streamy Awards. In 2019, the series received 11 Daytime Emmy Award nominations, winning two. At the 10th annual Indie Series Awards, Giants won a record-breaking seven awards, in addition to receiving the most nominations that year (19).

The series was profiled by Forbes and has received praise from the media for its depiction of mental illness in the African American community.
