= Brisk =

Brisk may refer to:

- Brisk (בריסק) is the city's name in Yiddish
  - Brest, Belarus (Brest-Litovsk)
  - Brześć Kujawski
- Brisk tradition and Soloveitchik dynasty, a school of Jewish thought originated by the Soloveitchik family of Brest (see also Brisker method)
- Brisk (drink), an iced tea soft drink produced by a joint venture between the Pepsi-Lipton Company and Unilever
