= Jason Harris =

Jason Harris may refer to:

- Jason Harris (marketer) (born 1971), president and CEO of the creative agency Mekanism
- Jason Harris (footballer, born 1969), English association football player for Burnley
- Jason Harris (footballer, born 1976), English association football player who played in the Football League for a number of clubs
- Jason Harris Katz (born 1969), American television personality and voice actor
- Jason James Harris, known as Moose Harris, British bassist
- Jason Harris, a retired wrestler with Extreme Championship Wrestling

== See also ==
- Jason Harris-Wright (born 1988), Irish rugby union player
- Jay Harris (disambiguation)
