= Philip DeFranco =

American YouTube personality (born 1985)

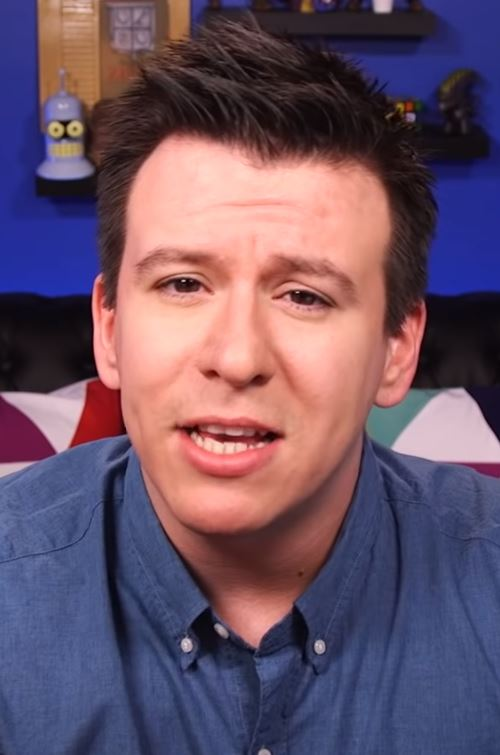
- DeFranco in 2018
- Born: Philip James Franchini Jr. December 1, 1985 (age 40); New York City, U.S.
- Occupation: YouTube personality
- Spouse: Lindsay Doty (m. 2015)
- Children: 2

YouTube information
- Channel: Philip DeFranco
- Years active: 2006–present
- Genres: News; current events; vlogging
- Subscribers: 6.61 million
- Views: 2.52 billion (public); 1.7+ billion (privatized)
- Philip DeFranco's voice On Sarah Hyland's controversy regarding an Instagram post she made Recorded January 2018
- Last updated: March 30, 2025
- Website: beautifulbastard.com

Philip James DeFranco (born Philip James Franchini Jr.; born December 1, 1985), commonly known by his online nickname PhillyD, and formerly known as sxephil, is an American media host and YouTube personality. He is best known for The Philip DeFranco Show, a news commentary show centered on current events in politics and pop culture.

DeFranco has also been involved in the creation of other successful channels on YouTube, such as the YouTube-funded news channel SourceFed and its nerd culture spinoff SourceFed Nerd. His primary channel has accumulated over 6.6 million subscribers and 2.5 billion views, as of January 2026. Having been involved on YouTube for two decades, he has been cited as a pioneer of YouTube and news coverage online, and has won various awards for his online content.

== Early life ==
DeFranco was born Philip James Franchini Jr. in The Bronx, New York City, New York. He is of Italian descent.

He was a student at the University of South Florida (USF), a biology student at Asheville–Buncombe Technical Community College, and later a junior at East Carolina University. In 2007, DeFranco lived in Tampa, Florida, and later Atlanta, Georgia. Once in Florida, he used his USF student loan to purchase a computer and camera. He worked as a waiter in a number of restaurants while making videos in 2007. DeFranco lived in a car until moving back with his father in Tampa, on condition that he would return to college, which he ultimately did not do.

DeFranco was raised Catholic but later identified as atheist.

== YouTube career ==
=== The Philip DeFranco Show ===
==== 2006–2011: Early years and building an audience ====
On September 15, 2006, DeFranco created his YouTube account during his finals at East Carolina University, originally registered as "sxephil", in which he talks about "newsie type stuff, and things that matter to [him] today." DeFranco has cited his early influences as Ze Frank, Dane Cook, and the Vlogbrothers. Early on, he began calling his news-centered videos The Philip DeFranco Show.

Before the YouTube partner program was available, he asked for donations from his viewers after claiming to have run out of money, and selling everything except his Mac, camera, and clothes, and overdrawing his bank account so he could spend a night in a hotel as he found it too scary sleeping in a car in Brooklyn.

In August 2007, DeFranco conducted an experiment by uploading a video titled "Big Boobs and You". The video's thumbnail image was what the title described, except that the image only flashed for a split second. The rest of the video's content was DeFranco talking. It quickly became his most successful video at the time, with 1.8 million views. From then on he changed his content to sex, gossip, and news.

An online viewer census from September 2007 showed that one-third of his viewers were 16- and 17-year-old girls. DeFranco used his large audience to win a Spore Creature Creator game promotion competition, and in doing so beat celebrities such as Stan Lee, Katy Perry, and Elijah Wood. The winner's prize was to choose which charity would receive a donation of $15,000. He chose the PKD Foundation, an organization dedicated to fighting polycystic kidney disease (PKD), which he attributed to his family's history with the condition. DeFranco's large online audience also enabled him to win Wired's Sexiest Geek of 2008 competition, a reader-voted contest. DeFranco entered the 2010s having his "sxephil" channel as the fifth-most subscribed on the platform.

==== 2012–2017: Revision3/Discovery/GroupNine years ====
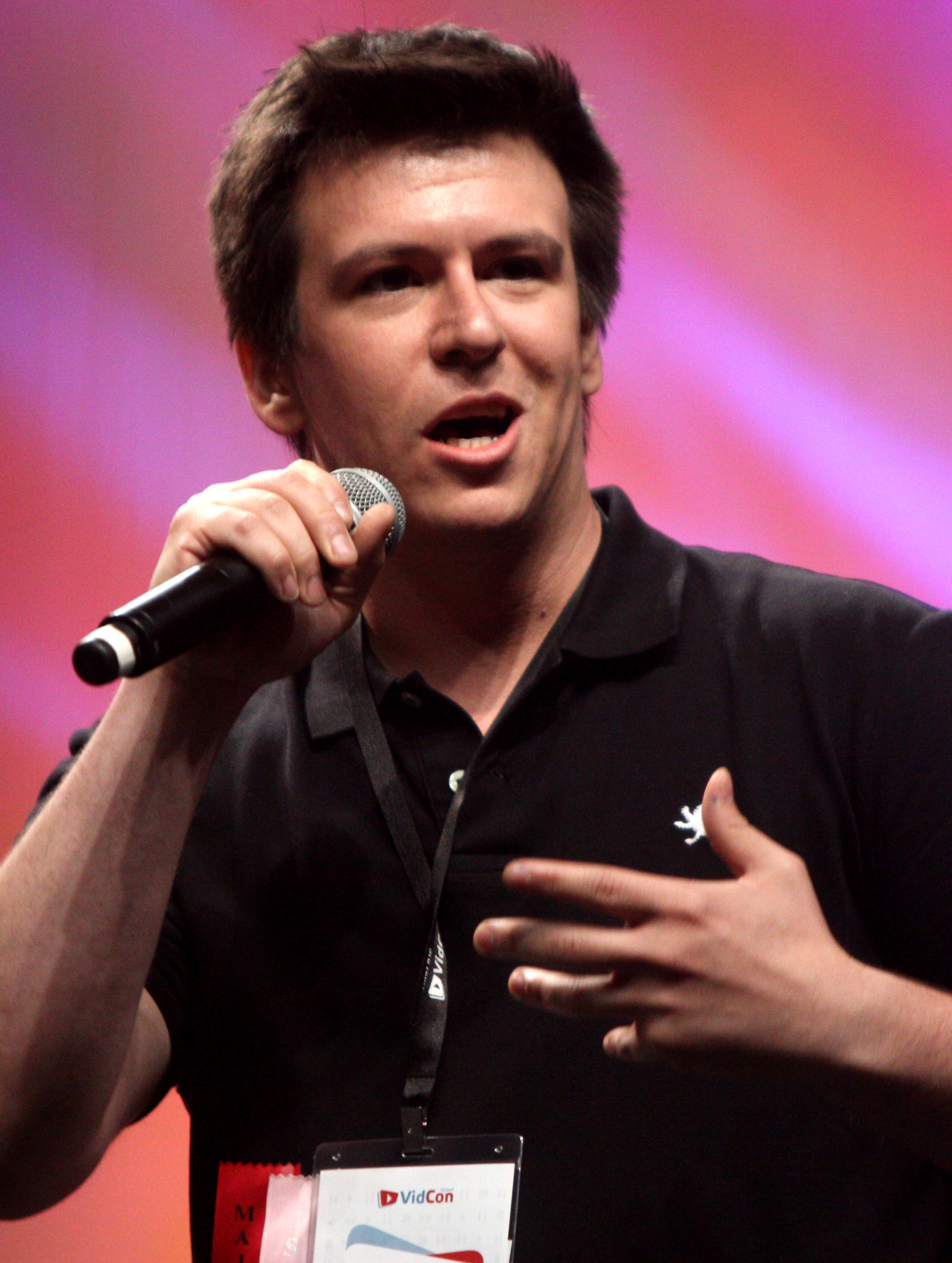
DeFranco at VidCon 2012

Entering 2012, DeFranco was signed with Revision3, a multi-channel network (MCN). Revision3 itself was a subsidiary of Discovery Digital Networks (DDN). DDN would later be sold by its parent Discovery Communications into Group Nine Media, in 2016. The Philip DeFranco Show was fully acquired by Revision3 in May 2013, along with his other assets at the time.

In September 2012, it was reported that DeFranco received almost 30 million views a month, while by October, his channel was noted to have accumulated 2 million subscribers. The Philip DeFranco Show was nominated at the 3rd Streamy Awards in the "Best First-Person Series" and "Best News and Culture Series" categories. In January 2013, DeFranco took part in a Google+ Hangout with United States Vice President Joe Biden and Guy Kawasaki, discussing gun laws.

==== 2017–present: Returning to independence ====
All of his channel's videos from before March 13, 2017, have been removed from public viewing. In May of that year, DeFranco announced he was no longer working with Group Nine Media and would instead be an independent creator again. In addition to this, DeFranco announced the launch of DeFranco Elite, a crowdfunding initiative on Patreon; DeFranco Elite functioned as a way for fans to help fund The Philip DeFranco Show, which DeFranco stated would help avoid the series' funding to be tied to YouTube ad revenue. By the end of the year, The Outline noted that DeFranco had over 13,000 Patreon subscribers donating an amount of money that while undisclosed was enough to rank him within the platform's top 20 creators. In 2019, DeFranco was earning approximately $50,000 a month from Patreon.

DeFranco's coverage of issues concerning YouTube culture—such as PewDiePie's alleged anti-Semitism controversy and the DaddyOFive child abuse story—were among those most cited by online and mainstream media publications. In his stories covering the DaddyOFive channel, DeFranco highlighted the channel's creators Mike and Heather Martin, and the abuse they inflicted on their children in videos posted on the channel. DeFranco's coverage and criticism of the channel sparked a community backlash and heightened media attention that led to the Martins losing custody of two of their children, and ultimately being charged with and found guilty of child neglect. Another topic DeFranco was noted by media publications for covering in 2017, was that of demonetization of YouTube creators. DeFranco continued to be frequently cited as critical of the platform, regarding issues involving ad revenue and demonetization, with noted criticism of ads being allowed on the YouTube channels of mainstream talk shows but not on those of native creators. Due to hot-button topics that can arise when delivering the news, DeFranco's content is particularly prone to being deemed "unfriendly" to advertisers.

In June 2017, DeFranco's channel was cited by The Verge as having over 5.4 million subscribers. DeFranco's subscriber growth slowed down in 2017, although his channel's monthly views continued to yield growing numbers.

In October 2018, BetterHelp gained attention from YouTube personalities after concerns were raised about alleged use of unfair pricing, paid reviews from actors, and questionable terms of service. Along with creators like Shane Dawson, DeFranco faced backlash for being among their most high-profile supporters. Both DeFranco and BetterHelp CEO Alon Matas addressed the issue, giving statements to Polygon's Julia Alexander. On October 15, DeFranco tweeted that he had formally ended his relationship with BetterHelp. In 2020, Anthony Fauci appeared on DeFranco's show for an interview, with the goal of bringing information related to the COVID-19 pandemic to younger audiences.

=== Secondary channels and other projects ===
In 2007, DeFranco opened his second YouTube channel, "'PhilipDeFranco", which includes a series of vlogs which he calls The Vloggity. He also streamed on BlogTV twice a week and took a cut of the revenue which was up to $12 CPMs. In 2008, he stated in an interview that his listed salary of $250,000 from a number of sources on the Internet, including and beyond YouTube, was initially a joke, but would become accurate. He has been paid by companies to create videos to promote Carl's Jr.'s burgers, and the US television series Lie to Me and Fringe.

DeFranco was a founding member of The Station, but left only a few months after it was created. DeFranco's early attempts at launching channels with scopes outside of his eponymous news series included BamBamKaboosh and TheDeFrancoUpdate. DeFranco also launched Like Totally Awesome (LTA), in which video reviews of a movie, video game, or technology were submitted by viewers and compiled into an episode of a video series called The Quad. The show was run by Sarah Penna, the creator of the YouTube multi-channel network Big Frame. Early in his YouTube career, Penna aided DeFranco, securing him coverage in news articles and magazines, such as Fast Company. One of those articles mentioned that DeFranco frequently collaborated with the advertising agency, Mekanism.

In July 2010, DeFranco co-created CuteWinFail, along with Toby Turner; the online series was described by Fruzsina Eördögh of ReadWrite as "essentially the YouTube equivalent of America's Funniest Home Videos." In 2011, DeFranco launched ForHumanPeoples, a merchandise line. In October 2013, as part of his network, DeFranco launched an accompanying ForHumanPeoples YouTube channel, based on the clothing and merchandise line.

==== Hooking Up ====
In October 2008, DeFranco co-starred with Jessica Rose and Kevin Wu in Hooking Up, written and directed by Woody Tondorf as a promo for HBOLabs (the online arm of HBO). Hooking Up is a scripted 10-episode web series set at a fictional university where the students spend most of their time emailing and using Facebook, but still manage to miscommunicate. Guest appearances on Hooking Up were made by Kevin Nalty, Michael Buckley, and other popular Internet celebrities.

By the show's second day on YouTube, it had received more than 450,000 views. Bobbie Johnson of The Guardian said that many Web surfers have "scoffed at what they see as a cynical attempt to cash in."

==== SourceFed ====
In January 2012, DeFranco launched SourceFed, which at the time was produced by James Haffner. This came around the same time in which DeFranco signed with Revision3. While the channel was hosted by other online personalities, DeFranco occasionally appeared on the channel. He also appeared alongside SourceFed co-hosts Elliott Morgan and Meg Turney, joining journalists at the 2012 Democratic and Republican National Conventions as part of YouTube's "Elections Hub" coverage. At the 3rd Streamy Awards, SourceFed was nominated for Best News and Culture Series, as well as Best Live Series and its #PDSLive 2012 Election Night Coverage program was nominated for Best Live Event. In May 2013, the spin-off SourceFed Nerd channel was launched.

==== Crashing Out podcast ====
In 2025, DeFranco started hosting the news comedy podcast Crashing Out With Philip DeFranco and Alex Pearlman with Internet personality and comedian Alex Pearlman (Pearlmania500).

=== Offline and guest appearances ===
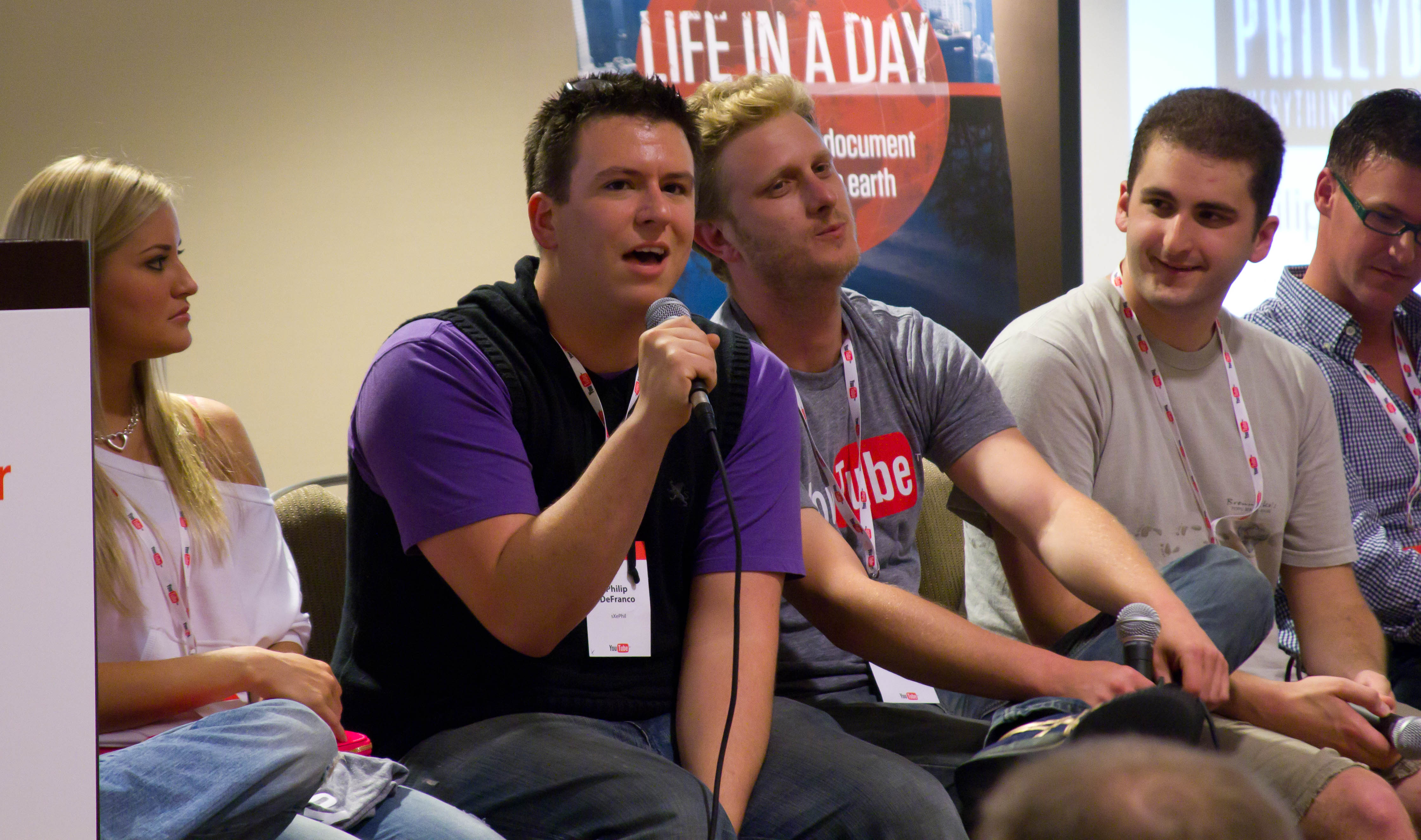
DeFranco (holding mic) at VidCon 2010

In July 2010, DeFranco attended the first VidCon event, where he was a speaker. Additionally, DeFranco has organized live shows and meetup events in locations such as Arizona, Los Angeles, and Toronto.

In August 2012, DeFranco hosted the 25th anniversary of Discovery Channel's Shark Week. In February 2013, DeFranco was featured as a guest judge on the second season of Internet Icon. In November, DeFranco was a special guest in a live pre-show simulcast for the Doctor Who 50th anniversary from YouTube Space LA.

== Entrepreneurship and business ventures ==
=== Early independent network aspirations ===
In February 2012, DeFranco stated he paid himself $100,000 a year, and reinvests the rest back into his company. In May, DeFranco's assets, including The Philip DeFranco Show and SourceFed, were acquired by Revision3, which itself was a subsidiary of Discovery Digital Networks. Upon the acquisition, DeFranco became added as an exec of Revision3, the Senior VP of a new Revision3 subsidiary, Phil DeFranco Networks and Merchandise.

DeFranco aspired to have launched channels within his network by the end of 2013, though due to "the logistical complications of joining Discovery, adding staff and strategizing the future," those plans did not materialize. DeFranco later planned 2014 to be the year that he would begin launching new channels. These plans once again fell through, but in 2015, DeFranco was involved in the launching of Super Panic Frenzy, a gaming network, including a YouTube channel and a Twitch live-stream show.

=== Rogue Rocket ===
Since regaining control over his properties from the Discovery Network in May 2017, DeFranco has been working towards broadening his content and reach. He began work on Rogue Rocket and would launch the news network on April 22, 2019. The network's launch was accompanied by a website. A YouTube channel for the network, produced by Amanda Morones and featuring news story breakdowns launched in July; these breakdowns are presented in longer formats (such as 10- to 30-minute mini-documentaries) than those seen on The Philip DeFranco Show. Instead of being hosted by DeFranco, the channel features an on-camera cast of correspondents; the first of these correspondents was Maria Sosyan. In addition to the website and YouTube channel, the Rogue Rocket network also comprised a podcast named A Conversation With, in which DeFranco hosts and interviews a subject.

=== Other ventures and partnerships ===
DeFranco launched Beautiful Bastard in February 2019, a line of hair care named after his catchphrase from the introductions of his news show. In June 2020, DeFranco signed with Semaphore Licensing Solutions to "seek out prospective manufacturing and retailer partners to bring DeFranco-branded products to market".

In November 2021, DeFranco was announced as the chief creator officer for Fourthwall, a startup designed to help content creators build their own branded websites.

== Public image and influence ==
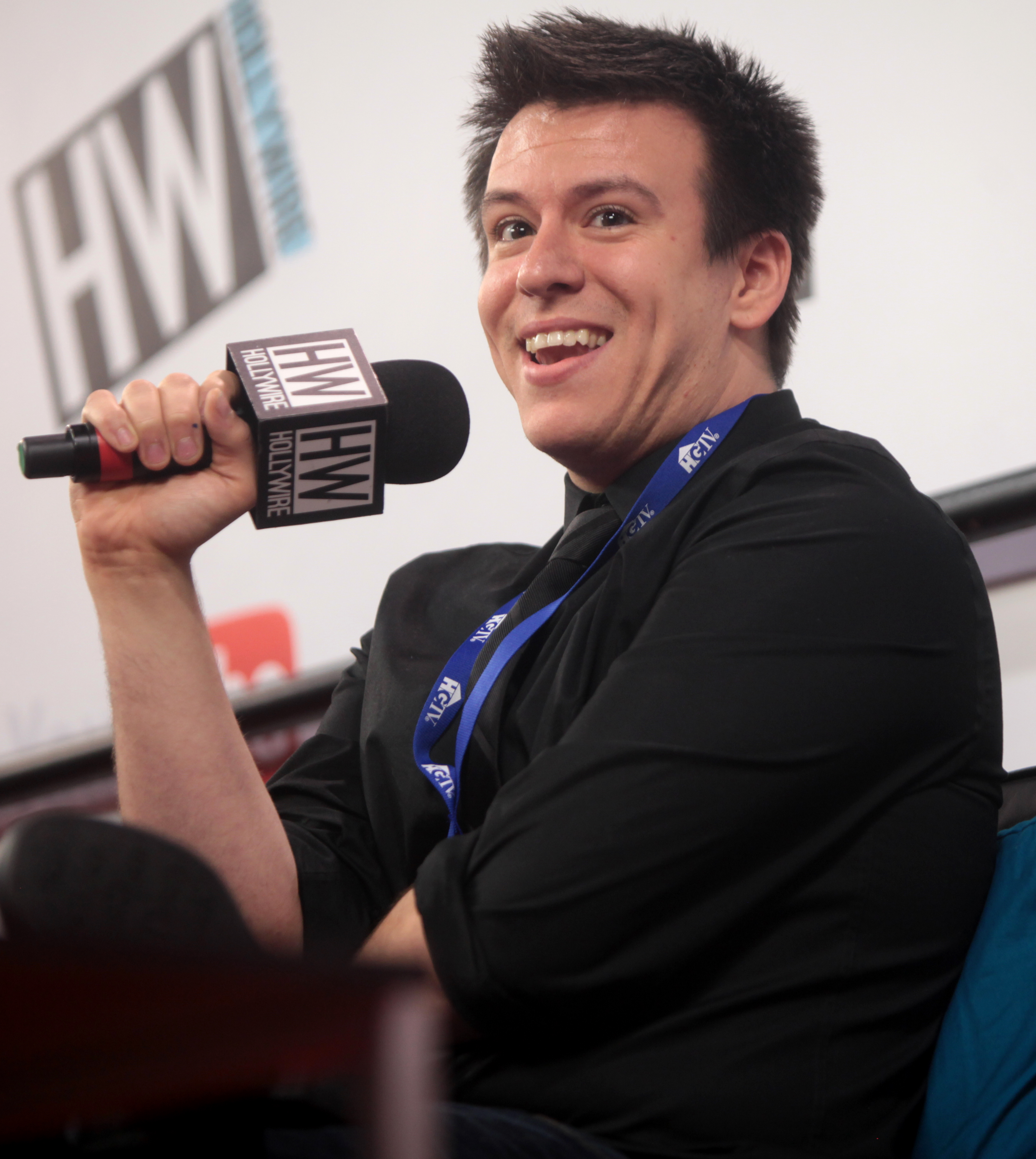
DeFranco at VidCon 2014

Due to joining YouTube in 2006 and soon gaining a sizable audience on the website, DeFranco has been cited as a pioneer of both YouTube and new media, in general. Lucas Shaw of TheWrap described DeFranco as "one of the first video bloggers to find success on YouTube, and has since built", as well as having an, "entrepreneurial spirit and understanding of YouTube". DeFranco was described by The Washington Post as part of the first generation of YouTube's creators, with the publication writing, "there are the originals, the older ones who became famous on YouTube when the only sort of Internet fame that existed was random viral stardom: Phil DeFranco, Jenna Marbles and Hannah Hart, for instance."

The Los Angeles Times has described DeFranco as, "the Walter Cronkite for the YouTube generation who generates hundreds of headlines in under 10 minutes". Sarah Kessler of Fast Company has referred to DeFranco as his generation's "Jon Stewart, if not Rupert Murdoch and News Corp". HuffPost has also likened DeFranco to Stewart, as well as Stephen Colbert and Bill Maher, commending DeFranco's ability to balance "important, controversial, and potentially dry topics" with pop culture stories.

David Cornell of The Inquisitr News wrote that DeFranco is "one of the leading sources of news" on YouTube and one of the platform's success stories. Julia Alexander of The Verge has similarly described DeFranco as "one of the most notable voices on the site," while the publication's Lizzie Plaugic described DeFranco's content as being more akin to that of a gossip or tabloid outlet. Plaugic wrote "the biggest differentiators of gossip channels are the hosts. Philip DeFranco tries to position himself as an objective, buttoned-up talk show host, even though his eponymous show is all about his take on the biggest names in YouTube drama."

DeFranco's ventures in creating an online media network have also been noted. Alex Iansiti of Huffington Post (now HuffPost) noted, "The Philip DeFranco Show is a great example of a media company to sprout out of YouTube". Variety similarly expressed that DeFranco has "built upon a cult following and turned his YouTube show into a bonafide media empire." By 2020, DeFranco's impact on the platform was well-established, with Lindsay Dodgson of Business Insider writing that he "is considered YouTube royalty". A late 2024 study by the Pew Research Center found that around 21% of Americans regularly get their news from "news influencers". A follow-up by Pew Research found no consensus regarding who came to mind when hearing the term "news influencer", though DeFranco was named by 3% of respondents, more than any other individual.

== Views ==
=== Politics ===
In 2015, DeFranco described himself as "fiscally conservative, socially liberal, for the most part." While on The Joe Rogan Experience podcast, DeFranco stated that prior to moving to California he was "ultra-liberal". Starting a business there caused him to lean more center. He voted for Libertarian Party nominee Gary Johnson in the 2012 United States presidential election, and declined to state who voted for in the 2016 election, though did share he did not vote "for either of the main two" candidates.

In an interview on The Rubin Report in 2017, DeFranco clarified that he no longer labels himself a libertarian. He further stated that the closest description of him that he had seen was "moderate free speech liberal". During the interview, DeFranco criticized the perceived authoritarian nature as well as Twitter activity of current U.S. president Donald Trump during Trump's first term. He also expressed support for LGBT rights, including gay marriage and transgender rights, and also stated he holds conservative views on company taxation.

In 2026, while commenting on the Macklemore–Ed Sheeran tour controversy, DeFranco stated "10 years ago I was the centrist fence-sitting final boss", adding that "I thought it made me enlightened, but looking back it was just cowardice. Too many things are too fucked rn [sic] to stay silent or neutral."

=== Media, news, and reporting ===
DeFranco has noted he likes to verify the news he covers and comments on, stating "I have to see several news sources that I trust." On this, Polygon has stated that DeFranco expressed paranoia relating to the need to ensure that stories are completely correct. DeFranco also likes to incorporate a "human side to every story," and has been known to specifically highlight optimistic or feel-good stories to counter the typical grittiness of a news cycle. When covering shootings, DeFranco only reports on known facts at the time and has a policy to not use the perpetrator's name or image.

Following PewDiePie's December 2019 announcement that he would be taking a break from posting on YouTube, CNN published an article about PewDiePie, focusing on his past controversies; DeFranco cited this CNN article when he addressed what he referred to as a "crisis of credibility problem" for mainstream media outlets.

=== YouTube ===
Beginning in 2016, DeFranco became notably critical of YouTube's advertising policies, as they would begin to result in widespread demonetization–a term describing an incident in which something triggered YouTube's system to remove advertisements from a video–for creators across the platform. DeFranco's criticism of YouTube regarding this topic would continue in the following years.

Dating as far back as 2008, DeFranco has been frequently cited as pondering a potential end to his eponymous news series or an exit from the platform altogether. DeFranco's reasons for this have varied from a personal want to "not overrun [his] time" to being frustrated with the platform's unstable revenue source. In April 2018, DeFranco again expressed frustrations with the YouTube platform and detailed his progress on developing a network; he hired a six-person research and investigative team, curated hosts for short- and long-form content, and tested a morning podcast, among other things in preparation for the network's launch. Months later while at VidCon, he stated that he saw himself walking from hosting the PDS within three years, saying "I don't know how to do the show I'm doing now in three years without phoning it in." He also added that he would remain online in some capacity, expressing, "in some way, I will always want to make a show and have that interaction, and I think that will evolve."

== Personal life ==
A video DeFranco posted shortly after the birth of his second son (September 10, 2017) explaining his situation at the time

DeFranco has polycystic kidney disease which he inherited from his father and grandfather. He has a younger sister named Sabrina.

DeFranco is married to media literacy and mental health advocate Lindsay Jordan DeFranco (née Doty). DeFranco proposed to Doty, then his longtime girlfriend, on August 16, 2013, at his "DeFranco Loves Dat AZ" show in Tempe, Arizona. Their first son, named Philip James "Trey" DeFranco III, was born in 2014. The couple married on March 7, 2015, and their wedding was captured on social media. Their second son, Carter William DeFranco, was born in 2017. In 2019, Lindsay launched Not So Fast, a media literacy campaign. The couple moved into their Encino home in late 2019 after previously living in San Fernando and Sherman Oaks. In 2024, they moved again, relocating to Georgia. Lindsay was the Democratic candidate for the 2026 Georgia House of Representatives election in the 47th district. She wound up losing to Republican nominee Jack Miller.

In April 2020, DeFranco posted on Twitter, expressing feelings of "heavier and heavier depression", and added he would be scrapping the episode of his eponymous show he was working on and taking a short break from YouTube.

== Filmography ==
| Year(s) | Title | Role | Episodes | Refs |
|---|---|---|---|---|
| 2007–present | The Philip DeFranco Show | Host | All, main role | |
| 2008 | Hooking Up | Nick | All, main role | |
| 2012 | Annoying Orange | Pot Roast | 1 | |
| 2013 | Internet Icon | Guest judge | 1 | |
| 2018 | Hot Ones | Himself | 1 | |
| 2019 | Gochi Gang | Himself | 1 | |

== Awards and nominations ==
| Year | Work | Category | Ceremony | Result | Ref. |
|---|---|---|---|---|---|
| 2008 | Philip DeFranco | Sexiest Geek | Wired reader poll | Won | |
| 2010 | Philip DeFranco | Best Vlogger | 2nd Streamy Awards | Nominated | |
| 2013 | The Philip DeFranco Show | Best News Series | 2nd IAWTV Awards | Won | |
| 2013 | The Philip DeFranco Show | Best Writing (Non-Fiction) | 2nd IAWTV Awards | Nominated | |
| 2013 | The Philip DeFranco Show | Best First-Person Series | 3rd Streamy Awards | Nominated | |
| 2013 | The Philip DeFranco Show | Best News and Culture Series | 3rd Streamy Awards | Won | |
| 2013 | SourceFed | Best News and Culture Series | 3rd Streamy Awards | Nominated | |
| 2013 | SourceFed | Audience Choice for Best Series of the Year | 3rd Streamy Awards | Won | |
| 2013 | SourceFed | Best Live Series | 3rd Streamy Awards | Nominated | |
| 2013 | SourceFed:#PDSLive 2012 Election Night Coverage | Best Live Event | 3rd Streamy Awards | Nominated | |
| 2014 | The Philip DeFranco Show | Audience Choice for Best Show of the Year | 4th Streamy Awards | Nominated | |
| 2014 | SourceFed | News and Current Events | 4th Streamy Awards | Won | |
| 2014 | SourceFed | Audience Choice for Best Show of the Year | 4th Streamy Awards | Nominated | |
| 2014 | SourceFed Nerd | Gaming | 4th Streamy Awards | Nominated | |
| 2015 | The Philip DeFranco Show | Best News and Culture Series | 5th Streamy Awards | Nominated | |
| 2015 | The Philip DeFranco Show | Audience Choice for Best Show of the Year | 5th Streamy Awards | Nominated | |
| 2016 | The Philip DeFranco Show | Best News and Culture Series | 6th Streamy Awards | Won | |
| 2016 | The Philip DeFranco Show | Audience Choice for Best Show of the Year | 6th Streamy Awards | Won | |
| 2017 | The Philip DeFranco Show | Best News and Culture Series | 7th Streamy Awards | Nominated | |
| 2017 | The Philip DeFranco Show | Audience Choice for Best Show of the Year | 7th Streamy Awards | Nominated | |
| 2018 | The Philip DeFranco Show | Best News and Culture Series | 8th Streamy Awards | Won | |
| 2018 | The Philip DeFranco Show | Audience Choice for Best Show of the Year | 8th Streamy Awards | Nominated | |
| 2019 | The Philip DeFranco Show | News | 9th Streamy Awards | Won | |
| 2019 | The Philip DeFranco Show | Show of the Year | 9th Streamy Awards | Nominated | |
| 2020 | The Philip DeFranco Show | News | 10th Streamy Awards | Nominated | |
| 2021 | The Philip DeFranco Show | News | 11th Streamy Awards | Nominated | |
| 2022 | The Philip DeFranco Show | News | 12th Streamy Awards | Nominated | |

== See also ==
- Viral marketing
- BlackBoxTV Presents
