= Alex Pearlman =

American internet personality and comedian

- Born: United States
- Other name: Pearlmania500
- Occupations: Comedian; internet personality
- Years active: 2002–present

TikTok information
- Page: Pearlmania500
- Genres: satirical news commentary, political activism
- Followers: 3.6 million

Alex Pearlman, also known by his online alias Pearlmania500, (born May 7, 1984) is an American comedian, podcaster, and internet personality. He is known for producing social media video content covering politics, current events, local news, and internet culture.

== Career ==
Pearlman began performing stand-up comedy in the early 2000s. He spent approximately two decades performing stand-up, including open mic performances, hosting, and feature work. In the late 2010s, he temporarily left stand-up comedy and took a customer service office job. He later returned to stand-up as his social media following grew, booking shows at Philadelphia venues such as the Helium Comedy Club. He has also appeared as a guest commentator on local broadcast television programs, including FOX 29 Philadelphia.

Pearlman subsequently built a large audience on TikTok, where he posts short-form commentary and explainer videos. His account grew to approximately 1.7 million followers by June 2023, 2.7 million by August 2024, and 3.4 million by August 2026. He received widespread national media attention in June 2023 following the collapse of a section of Interstate 95 in Philadelphia. His viral commentary on the incident caught the attention of Pennsylvania Governor Josh Shapiro's communications team, leading to an invitation to cover the rebuilding event alongside President Joe Biden.

In 2024, Pearlman won a write-in campaign to become a local Democratic committee person, a political effort he stated began over a neighborhood dispute concerning a stop sign. Although he had previously posted rants criticizing Democratic Party strategy, he later supported Kamala Harris's presidential candidacy and attended the 2024 Democratic National Convention in Chicago as a credentialed social media creator. Outlets such as Politico have cited his online work when analyzing political campaigns leveraging digital creators. His political commentary has also included critiques of political figures such as Pete Hegseth, as well as opposition to proposed government bans of TikTok.

The Philadelphia Inquirer named Pearlman to its list of the top 20 TikTok accounts from Philadelphia, highlighting his current-events explainers. In 2024, WIRED profiled Pearlman as an example of a creator who used short-form video to build a career and launch a nationwide comedy tour. His digital content covers varied topics, including satire suggesting job seekers lie about working for Twitter, criticism of Burning Man, the Philadelphia Phillies' "Dollar Dog Night" promotion, character themes in X-Men '97 concerning Gambit, theories about Pokémon GO, AI-generated videos on YouTube, and Dolly Parton's philanthropy. He has also discussed platform moderation practices, stating that social media algorithms shadowban or suppress videos that direct viewers to external sites like YouTube.

In addition to short-form videos, Pearlman co-hosts the news comedy podcast Crashing Out With Philip DeFranco and Alex Pearlman alongside media host Philip DeFranco, and co-hosts Too Many Tabs with Pearlmania500 with his wife. He has also appeared as a guest on independent programs such as The Zekely Podcast.
