= Secrets of the Magic City =

- Film poster
- Directed by: R. Malcolm Jones
- Written by: R. Malcolm Jones
- Produced by: Jai M. Santiago; R. Malcolm Jones; Udonis Haslem; Vincent Herbert; Flo Rida
- Starring: Erika Alexander; Vanessa Baden; Sharlene Betancourt; Amiya Thomas; Coi Collins; Taj Collins; Keith David; Angela Golden Bryan; Jamie Hector; Jenifer Lewis; Frank Licari
- Cinematography: R. Malcolm Jones
- Edited by: Brandon Dumlao
- Production company: New Revolution Studios
- Distributed by: EOne Entertainment
- Release date: June 26, 2015
- Running time: 115 minutes
- Country: United States
- Language: English

Secrets of the Magic City is an American comedy drama film written and directed by R. Malcolm Jones. The film stars Jenifer Lewis, Jamie Hector, Keith David, and Erika Alexander. Many scenes from the motion picture had been filmed in earlier years (such as the scene which included boy band, Mindless Behavior), but wasn't released until June 26, 2015, by New Revolution Studios.

== Plot ==
Set in the vibrant atmosphere of Miami's underground teenage club world, we follow the powerful journey of Amiya Castle, who feels discarded by her mother after being left to spend the summer with relatives. In the gritty Liberty City area, Amiya, a deeply troubled girl, comes face to face with unbelievable circumstances of tragedy and turmoil that she chronicles. When Amiya is forced to explain a school report, she reveals accounts of her summer infatuation with the neighborhood thug and of a young girl's attempt to keep her drug-addicted mother alive.

Amiya also sets out to explain the tragic story of two sisters, Nia and Tiana, who are fiercely devoted to each other and to staying out of the welfare system, where they spent several years after their mother abandoned them. Now living with their only available relative, Aunt Georgia, Nia and Tiana, feel hopeful for the first time in their young lives. After an unexpected death occurs, the girls’ friendship grows into a tight bond, where personal lessons are learned and a dark secret is kept.

== Cast ==
- Erika Alexander as Ms. Fletcher
- Vanessa Baden as Tracey
- Amiya Thomas as Amiya
- Latrice Jackson as Tiana
- Lashalle Jackson as Nia
- Coi Leray as Brittany
- Taj Collins as Darius
- Keith David as Mr. Daniels
- Angela Golden Bryan as Jackelyn Castle
- Jamie Hector as Tru
- Jenifer Lewis as Aunt Valerie
- Frank Licari as Officer Gomez

== Release ==
Secrets of the Magic City screened at the 2013 American Black Film Festival (ABFF) in the "Narrative" category it screened at the 2013 Annual Urban World Film Festival in New York City and the 2013 Bronze Lens Film Festival in Atlanta where Jamie Hector and Jenifer Lewis were nominated and won awards for Best Actor and Actress. The film debuted on Centric TV June 26, 2015 and received worldwide distribution with EOne Entertainment.
