= Giants (web series) =

American web series

- Genre: Drama
- Created by: James Bland
- Written by: James Bland, Vanessa Baden, Christina Martin, J. August Richards
- Country of origin: United States
- Original language: English
- No. of seasons: 2
- No. of episodes: 13

Production
- Executive producers: Issa Rae, Jussie Smollett
- Running time: 16-68 minutes

Original release
- Network: YouTube, BET+
- Release: January 25, 2017 – April 25, 2018

Giants is an American web series created by James Bland and starring Bland, Sean Samuels, and Vanessa Baden as the lead characters. The series premiered on Issa Rae's YouTube channel on January 25, 2017. A second season premiered on the same channel in 2018. Both seasons were financed by crowdfunding campaigns on Indiegogo. It has since been acquired and released for streaming on BET+.

The series has won numerous accolades, including two Daytime Emmy Awards, a Streamy Award, and multiple Indie Series Awards. The series received praise from the media for its depiction of mental illness in the African American community.

== Plot ==
Giants chronicles the trials and tribulations of three African American friends as they approach their thirties, each battling their own inner "giants" as they navigate adulthood.

== Background ==
Bland worked on several other series before writing Giants, and following the success of Issa Rae's Awkward Black Girl, he felt inspired to make his own series. After writing the first season, Bland created an Indiegogo campaign to crowdfund the series. Rae and actor Jussie Smollett subsequently came on board as executive producers.

== Release ==
The first season was released through Issa Rae's YouTube channel in 2017, followed by the second season in 2018. The series was then picked up and re-released by BET+.

=== Episodes ===
The first season, released on January 25, 2017, consists of six episodes, while the second, which consists of seven episodes, was released on February 21, 2018. Episodes were released once a week on a weekly basis. (Note: These release dates are from the original YouTube release)

Season	Episodes	Originally released	
Season	Episodes	First released	Last released
1	6	January 25, 2017	March 1, 2017
2	7	February 21, 2018	April 25, 2018

=== Accolades ===
Giants has won numerous accolades. In 2018, the series won the award for Best Drama Series at the 8th annual Streamy Awards. In 2019, the series received 11 Daytime Emmy Award nominations, winning two. At the 10th annual Indie Series Awards, Giants won a record-breaking seven awards, in addition to receiving the most nominations that year (19).
