= Jay Harris =

Jay Harris may refer to:

- Jay Harris (footballer, born 1987), English footballer
- Jay Harris (sportscaster) (born 1965), American journalist
- Jay Harris (boxer) (born 1990), Welsh professional boxer
- Jay M. Harris, American scholar and Harry Austryn Wolfson Professor of Jewish Studies at Harvard University.
- Jay T. Harris (born 1948), African-American journalist
- Jay Kennedy Harris (born 1995), Australian rules footballer

== See also ==
- Jayden Harris (born 1999), English footballer
- Jason Harris (disambiguation)
