= The Philip DeFranco Show =

US YouTube webseries

- Channel banner of DeFranco's channel
- Also known as: The PDS
- Genre: Pop culture and news
- Created by: Philip DeFranco
- Presented by: Philip DeFranco
- Country of origin: United States

Production
- Running time: around 18 to 35 minutes

Original release
- Network: Rogue Rocket; Revision3/Group Nine Media (formerly)
- Release: June 21, 2007 – present

Related
- SourceFed; The Vloggity; ForHumanPeoples

The Philip DeFranco Show, often abbreviated and referred to as the PDS, is a pop culture and news web series hosted by American YouTuber Philip DeFranco, and his main claim to fame. The show has gone through several schedule changes through its lifetime, but as of 2023, airs weekly, Monday through Thursday. The first video with The Philip DeFranco Show included in its intro was uploaded on June 21, 2007.

As DeFranco became increasingly popular, he signed with Revision3, which would eventually acquire all of DeFranco's assets, including the PDS. The Philip DeFranco Show has been sponsored by Netflix, Ting, and State Farm. The show has been nominated for and has won several awards that focus on internet culture and web series. In 2017, DeFranco purchased his assets back from Group Nine (the company that replaced Discovery Digital Networks) and the Philip DeFranco Show is now a part of the Philip DeFranco Network and produced by Rogue Rocket, DeFranco's production company.

== Format ==
The show is recorded by DeFranco. The PDS is then edited by James Girardier so that the episode is presented in a fast paced vlog format, complemented with use of frequent jump cuts throughout. The topics discussed in the show vary, but usually cover pop culture and news. In the early 2010s, episodes usually had a 10-minute duration in which Defranco lists both arguments of a story and then states his opinion. By 2021, episodes became up to 20 minutes long. During the show's early existence in 2007, DeFranco stated that he usually searched websites such as Technorati to find topics to discuss. Episodes of the series include recurring segments, such as the "Douchebag of the Day" segment and "Today in Awesome."

Some of the older episodes have been noted to include racy thumbnails, such as Big Boobs and You. As of June 2013, the video now holds a thumbnail of DeFranco speaking. The video was chosen as one of DeFranco's top five YouTube moments by New Media Rockstars. DeFranco commented on racy thumbnails in a Los Angeles Times article.

Eventually, DeFranco's format included a consistent opening line of "Sup, you beautiful bastards", or "What's going on, you beautiful bastards," noted as intentionally casual. For some time, the show's background set design featured a bright, distinctive blue DeFranco jokingly called "Phil Blue." Forbes contributor Fruzsina Eordogh commented "It was a very unique cobalt. The geeky toys on the shelves and various art [...] adorning the walls behind him let the viewer know what fandom he belonged to (like Star Wars, for example)." DeFranco introduced a new set in 2018. The Verge described DeFranco's show as "styled after anchored news shows," and added that he sits on a couch in the style of late-night shows.

== History ==
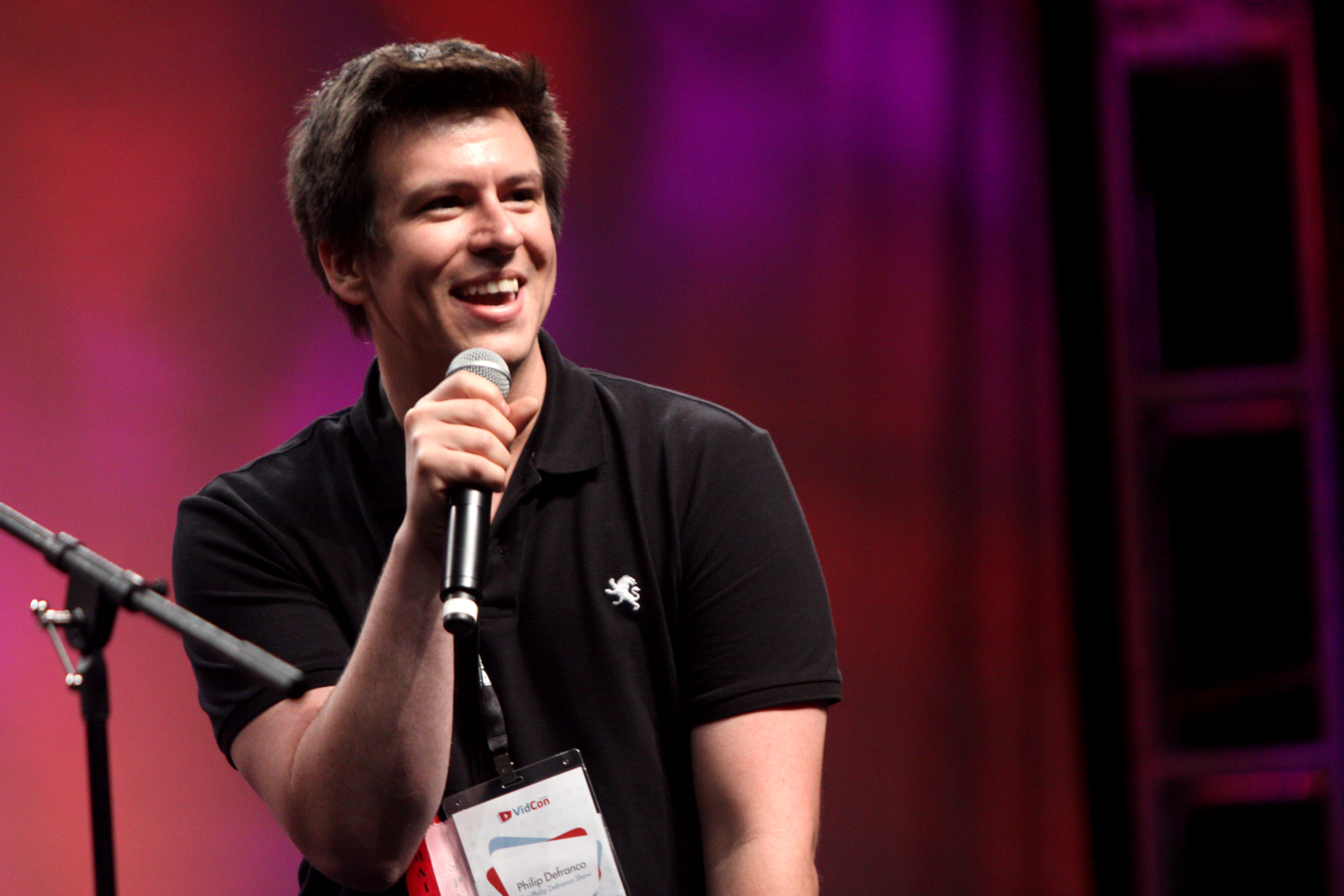
Philip DeFranco speaking at VidCon 2012

DeFranco created his sxephil channel on September 15, 2006. DeFranco would begin to upload vlogs, before uploading the first PDS on June 21, 2007. Despite this, the show's debut date is disputed, and has been cited as being in 2006.

Early episodes of The Philip DeFranco Show were short and black and white for either most of or the entire duration of an episode. This was because DeFranco was limited to a $20 black and white camera.

In 2008, an episode of the PDS used footage of the 2008 Toronto propane explosion captured by then 24-year-old Saejin Oh without permission, a violation of YouTube's community guidelines. "I’m disgusted by it," said Oh in an email exchange. "Personally, I’m not worried they stole my video or made profit out of it. I’m rather more disgusted by the fact that they used a video of real-life event that caused death of two people to pay tribute to ... a movie." DeFranco declined a request from Wired for an interview on the subject. Saejin Oh submitted a YouTube copyright strike with YouTube, and the entire PDS video (not just the short segment featuring Oh's content) was eventually taken down. The video received over 351,094 views and had monetization enabled, giving DeFranco potentially hundreds of dollars from Google AdSense (if earning the average CPM).

During December 2008, one of his videos was removed from the front page, although, as a YouTube partner, his account was not suspended.

In May 2013, The Philip DeFranco Show, as well as DeFranco's other assets, were acquired by Revision3, a network which DeFranco was signed to. On May 1, 2017, DeFranco announced via his YouTube series that he would be launching a Patreon campaign and network called DeFranco Elite, reclaiming the assets of the Philip DeFranco Show to extend the brand on his own, with the help of his fans and followers. However, some fans were upset with DeFranco for claiming transparency despite not revealing the amount of money and donors he has.

Over the course of the series, guests have appeared on the show, such as cosplayer Jessica Nigri, and video game journalist Adam Sessler. In 2020, YouTube tapped various YouTubers, with DeFranco amongst them, to interview Anthony Fauci, with the goal of bringing information related to the COVID-19 pandemic to younger audiences. In October 2022, fellow content creator Logan Paul appeared on DeFranco's show for an interview, during which he accused musician Bad Bunny of tax fraud.

In 2021, DeFranco partnered with the digital entertainment and content company Jellysmack to repurpose his show for distribution on Snapchat and Facebook. Though he previously already expanded his show to Snapchat, the partnership with Jellysmack fully relaunched the series on the platform and moved it to an upload schedule of three times per week.

=== Potential discontinuation ===
DeFranco has, on several occasions, announced the "end" of The Philip DeFranco Show. Each time, he quickly went against his word. The first time was on November 3, 2008, when DeFranco announced the show would end on November 3, 2009. DeFranco stated in an interview, "I don't want to overrun my time because it'll mean a lot less to me." On October 6, 2009, however, DeFranco announced that the show would continue past November 3, 2009. On April 22, 2010, DeFranco announced, in the show's then-final episode, the conclusion of the show's run. However, DeFranco stated he "needed to cancel the show", due to a contract he signed with a company "way back in the day" that allowed them to advertise his show, which he would have to agree to. DeFranco would continue uploading similar content on his sxephil channel, under the name Not Safe For Work, which was abbreviated NSFW. The show, however, shortly returned to its original format, on May 7, 2010. On December 19, 2013, DeFranco once again flirted with the idea of ending the PDS, tweeting out, "I think 2014 is going to be the last year of the PDS. But we'll have 365 days to figure it out together." The show would continue into 2015, however.

== Reception ==
The show has been able to attract large view numbers, as a Los Angeles Times article states "at its best, surpassing the average viewership of such recognizable programs as CNN's Anderson Cooper 360, HLN's Nancy Grace, MSNBC's The Rachel Maddow Show and even Comedy Central's The Daily Show With Jon Stewart". By early 2013, DeFranco's sxephil channel, driven almost entirely on the PDS, had accumulated over one billion video views. The series has been met with critical success, as well; DeFranco has been called "the Walter Cronkite of the YouTube generation". DeFranco has also been compared to Jon Stewart. Despite this, DeFranco has stated that "... in no world should I ever be considered a journalist. I'm just a guy talking about the world trying to have a conversation with people."

In 2016, Aja Romano of Vox wrote that on The PDS, DeFranco is known for his "candid, often satirical delivery and his willingness to cover everything from celebrity gossip to memes."

The PDS has been criticized for being "YouTube-centric". DeFranco has admitted that a common criticism he receives is his use of jump cuts throughout episodes of the show.

== Awards and accolades ==
| Year | Category | Award | Result | Ref. |
|---|---|---|---|---|
| 2010 | Best Vlogger | 2nd Streamy Awards | Nominated | |
| 2013 | Best News Web Series | 2nd IAWTV Awards | Won | |
| 2013 | Best Writing (Non-Fiction) | 2nd IAWTV Awards | Nominated | |
| 2013 | Best First-Person Series | 3rd Streamy Awards | Nominated | |
| 2013 | Best News and Culture Series | 3rd Streamy Awards | Won | |
| 2014 | Show of the Year | 4th Streamy Awards | Nominated | |
| 2015 | Show of the Year | 5th Streamy Awards | Nominated | |
| 2015 | News and Culture | 5th Streamy Awards | Nominated | |
| 2016 | Show of the Year | 6th Streamy Awards | Won | |
| 2016 | Best News and Culture Series | 6th Streamy Awards | Won | |
| 2017 | Show of the Year | 7th Streamy Awards | Nominated | |
| 2017 | Best News and Culture Series | 7th Streamy Awards | Nominated | |
| 2018 | Show of the Year | 8th Streamy Awards | Nominated | |
| 2018 | Best News Series | 8th Streamy Awards | Won | |
| 2019 | Show of the Year | 9th Streamy Awards | Nominated | |
| 2019 | News | 9th Streamy Awards | Won | |
| 2020 | News | 10th Streamy Awards | Nominated | |
| 2021 | News | 11th Streamy Awards | Nominated | |
| 2022 | News | 12th Streamy Awards | Nominated | |

== Media ==
DeFranco reacts to the React World controversy (February 1, 2016).
