= Typical Gamer =

Canadian YouTuber and streamer (born 1992)

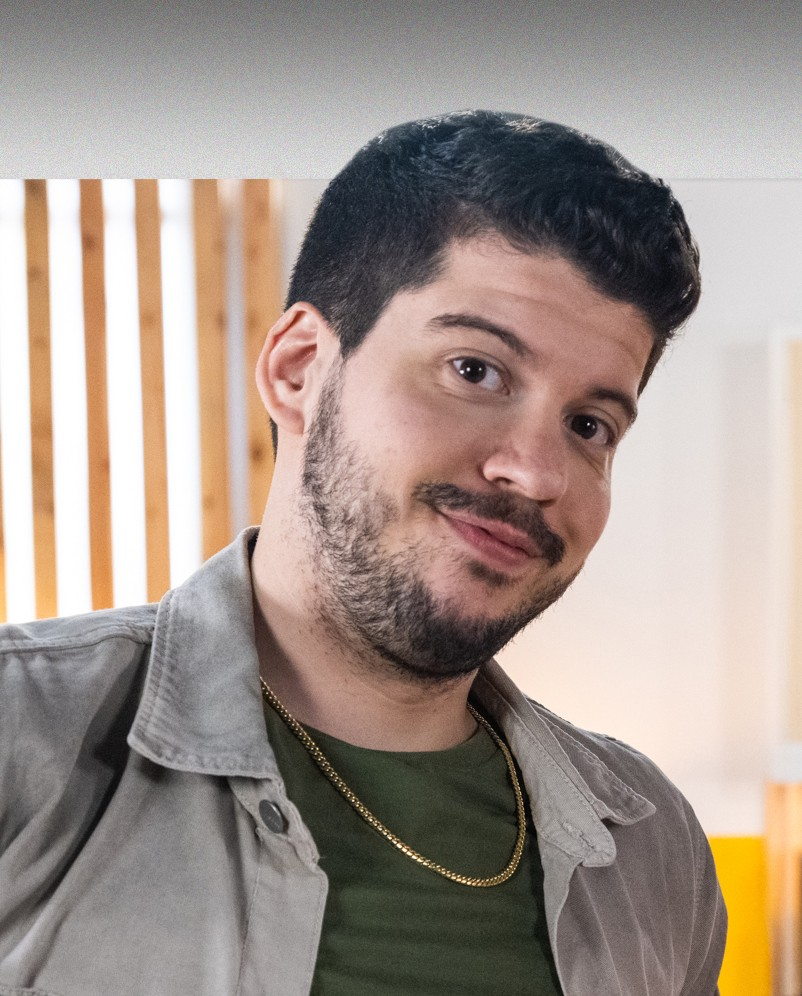
- Rebelo-Soares in 2023
- Born: Andre Rebelo-Soares; March 23, 1992 (age 34); Toronto, Ontario, Canada
- Occupations: YouTuber; live streamer
- Years active: 2008–present
- Organization: Jogo Games
- Spouse: Samara Redway (m. 2024)

Twitch information
- Channel: TypicalGamer
- Years active: 2008–2014; 2023–present
- Genres: Gaming; Just Chatting
- Game: Fortnite
- Followers: 1 million

YouTube information
- Channels: Typical Gamer; TG Plays; More Typical Gamer
- Years active: 2007–present
- Genre: Gaming
- Subscribers: 16 million (main channel); 9 million (TG Plays); 651 thousand (More Typical Gamer)
- Views: 5.68 billion (main channel); 3.54 billion (TG Plays); 65.5 million (More Typical Gamer)
- Last updated: June 20, 2026
- Website: typical.store

Andre Rebelo-Soares (born March 23, 1992), professionally known as Typical Gamer, is a Canadian YouTuber, streamer, and professional Fortnite player. Born in Toronto, Canada, Rebelo-Soares began his career on YouTube in 2008, mainly uploading videos on the game Red Dead Redemption and later Grand Theft Auto, where he began gaining popularity.

In 2024, Rebelo-Soares, alongside YouTuber Mustard Plays, founded Jogo Games, a video game studio that creates video games inside Fortnite using Unreal Editor for Fortnite.

== Early life ==
Andre Rebelo-Soares was born on March 23, 1992, in Toronto, Canada. He has a brother, Billy, who came up with the name for his channel. He dropped out of college twice before starting a channel.

== Career ==
Rebelo-Soares created his YouTube channel in August 2008. His first video was gameplay of the video game Red Dead Redemption. He initially gained popularity through his videos of Grand Theft Auto. Rebelo-Soares is also a professional Fortnite player, playing in weekly and competitive tournaments and nearly qualifying for the Fortnite World Cup in 2019.

In 2020, Rebelo-Soares signed an exclusive streaming deal with YouTube, and in celebration, donated $10,000 to the Extra Life charity. In 2023, he started an advertising and brand partnership with Studio71. He became the first creator on Fortnite Creative to reach 1 million followers in April 2025. In May 2026, Fortnite added cosmetics based on Rebelo-Soares to the game.

=== Jogo Games ===
In May 2024, Rebelo-Soares and Chad Mustard, known professionally as Mustard Plays, founded Jogo Games (stylized as Jogo Games), a video game studio focused on creating video games in the 2017 video game Fortnite using tools such as Fortnite Creative and Unreal Editor for Fortnite (UEFN) with a 2 million dollar commitment. In mid-2025, Jogo collaborated with the late rapper XXXTentacion for a live concert inside their Red vs. Blue game in Fortnite.

In 2026, Jogo acquired RHQ Creative, including the company's catalog of games, as a step towards their "Pro" division launch. In 2026, Jogo created a Star Wars game titled Galactic Siege in partnership with Epic Games to expand Epic's "metaverse." In March 2026, Jogo announced a "GTA-like" game based on the upcoming Grand Theft Auto VI.

== Personal life ==
Rebelo-Soares married his wife, Samara Redway, in December 2024. The ceremony was livestreamed on his YouTube channel. As of 2026, the couple live in Vancouver.

== Video games ==
Year	Title	Role	Notes	Ref.
2026	Fortnite Battle Royale	Himself (likeness)	playable character	

== Awards and nominations ==
Year	Award	Category	Result	Ref.
2018	Streamy Awards	Gaming	Nominated	
2020	Streamy Awards	Live Streamer	Nominated	
2023	Streamy Awards	Competitive Gamer	Nominated	
2024	The Game Awards	Content Creator of the Year	Nominated	
