= Mekanism =

American creative agency

- Type: Independent
- Industry: Advertising, Marketing
- Founded: 2000
- Founder: Tommy Means
- Headquarters: San Francisco, CA, United States
- Number of locations: 4 San Francisco; New York City; Chicago; Seattle
- Area served: Worldwide
- Key people: Tommy Means; (Creative Director/Director); Jason Harris; (President/CEO)
- Revenue: $28 million (2013)
- Website: http://www.mekanism.com/

Mekanism is a San Francisco-based creative agency that specializes in the development and production of marketing campaigns, commercials and branded entertainment for multinational companies. The agency added a New York City office in 2008.

== History ==
=== Founding ===
Mekanism was founded in 2000 by Tommy Means as a subdivision of the San Francisco-based company Complete Pandemonium. Means early on anticipated the internet's potential as a storytelling medium and identified a market gap for a company that focused its efforts on it. In 2003 Means spun off the company as an independent fully integrated creative production studio to develop branded content outside traditional television commercial channels.

=== Growth ===
Mekanism added three key partners: Pete Caban as head of Digital and Strategic Development, as well as Ian Kovalik as a director and Creative Director in 2003, and Jason Harris as an executive producer then President in 2005. During this period, the agency began to develop its reputation for reaching younger audiences and telling branded stories in off-beat ways that tended to go viral. In those years, as much as 90% of Mekanism's work came from other ad agencies (instead of directly from clients) looking to execute creative ideas on emerging media platforms. In 2004 and 2005, they began receiving recognition for their work with two consecutive Cannes Golden Lion awards for campaigns on behalf of Napster and Sega.

As a result, Mekanism's business increased twenty-fold; from $472,000 in 2003 to approximately $9.6 million in 2007. In 2008, they opened an office in New York City to accommodate the growth. With Mekanism's revenue increasing by orders of magnitude, so too were the number and size of their clients. The agency has completed campaigns for such companies as Microsoft, Nike, Axe, Frito-Lay, PepsiCo, Nordstrom, Google, Muscle Milk, and GE.

=== Full-Service Agency ===
Soon after this period, Mekanism increased its focus on creating viral content and focussed their efforts almost exclusively on clients directly. Harris took over the CEO title from Caban to become President/CEO. In 2011, the agency created its first Super Bowl spot for Brisk Iced Tea starring Eminem. It ended up as the No. 1 most-viewed video on YouTube after Super Bowl XLV aired. In 2012, Mekanism launched a campaign for the American Society for the Prevention of Cruelty to Animals with Dan Harris from ABC’s Nightline featuring Harris's adopted cat, "Hovercat"; the video went viral and garnered over 1 million views, with Brendan Gahan, Mekanism's Director of Social Media, noting, "The internet loves cats and it was done for a good cause so it's great to see people rally around it." In early 2013 Mekanism created the ad campaign “Youphoria” for the fashion retailer Nordstrom.

Mekanism also became the Agency of Record for Method Home, Muscle Milk, Pepsi, Brisk Ice Tea, Amp Energy Drink, Art.com, and Virgin Mobile.

As of 2022, Mekanism clients included Peloton, OkCupid, Jose Cuervo, Fanatics, Inc. and the NBA App.

In June 2022, the entrepreneurial network Plus Company Canada, bought Mekanism. On October 31, 2022, Eleven, whose brands included CommonSpirit Health, Pella and Kraken, became part of Mekanism, planning to move into the company's San Francisco facilities. Mekanism's New York City office also houses Plus Company's New York City operation, and the San Francisco office will become Plus Company's office for that area.

In April 2025, Mekanism merged with Camp Jefferson and Jungle, two other Plus Company agencies, to form Mekanism Canada.

== Notable campaigns ==
Campaigns Designed and Produced by Mekanism
Client (Product)	Campaign	Year	Awards/Nominations
Napster (Relaunch)	"EKG", "Metal", "The Deal"	2003, 2004	Cannes Golden Lion (2)
Sega (Super Monkey Ball Deluxe)	"True Adventures of Chad"	2005	Cannes Golden Lion, One Show silver, Clio bronze, ANDY bronze
Microsoft (Windows Vista)	"Clearification"	2006	Cannes Silver Lion (2), ANDY bronze, Clio bronze (2), Webby (2)
Axe (Body Spray)	"World's Dirtiest Film"	2007	Cannes Shortlist
Toyota (Matrix)	"Yourotheryou.com"	2008	
Frito-Lay (Tostitos)	"NOLAF.org"	2008	ADDY Gold (3), One Show silver, D&AD Yellow Pencil (2)
Axe (Body Spray)	"The Fixers"	2009	Webby
Nike (Running)	"Human Race"	2009	
eBay (holiday shopping)	"Love to Give"	2010	
PepsiCo-Lipton (Brisk Iced Tea)	"That's Brisk Baby!"	2011	London International silver, AICP Show nominee
Fast Company (Front cover)	"The Influence Project"	2011	Webby Finalist, ASME National Magazine Finalist
20th Century Fox and Rise of the Planet of the Apes	"Ape with AK-47"	2011	Cannes Shortlist, 16th Most Viewed Viral Ad of All Time
Brisk	Brisksaber mobile app	2012	2 million downloads
Sierra Club	"Beyond Coal Initiative"	2012	
Method (multiple products)	"Clean Happy"	2012	
Nightline	"Hovercat"	2012	
Nordstrom	"Youphoria"	2013	
Pepsi	"Super Bowl XLVIII Soundcheck"	2014	USA Today’s 2014 “Super Bowl Top 10 Ad Meter”
Pepsi	"Pepsi Mini Oscar"	2014	9 million YouTube views
Peloton	“The Gift that Gives Back”	2019	Peloton stock loses $1.5bn in value

=== The Influence Project ===
In May 2010, the business magazine Fast Company published a profile of Mekanism, during which Harris claimed that the firm could "guarantee [they] can create an online campaign and make it go viral." The author challenged them to "prove it" with a wager whereby if Mekanism created a viral campaign for Fast Company, the author would document it for the magazine from conception to launch. Mekanism pitched a number of ideas and Fast Company ultimately selected one—initially called the "Cover Project"—that came to be known as "The Influence Project." The campaign aimed to name 2010's Most Influential Person by getting people to sign up, have their social networks click on their profile links and sign up themselves. Participants would have their pictures appear in a photospread in the November 2010 issue and the greater their influence, the larger their picture would be.

Social media critics were skeptical of the means and metrics with which Mekanism designed the project; calling it a gimmick and an "ornate marketing rickroll." Despite the criticism, the project had 6,000 people sign up within the first 24 hours finishing with 30,000 people in the end. Fast Company generated a traffic of 1.2 million visitors on their site and commented that they "couldn't be more impressed with the response."

=== Super Bowl XLVII ===
Mekanism was retained by Pepsi to create buzz surrounding Beyoncé’s Super Bowl XLVII Halftime Show for 2014. The company asked fans to submit photos in different poses to compile into the video, creating the first fan-made halftime intro. The campaign collected over 120,000 user submissions, generating over 5.5 billion impressions.

== Reception ==
Mekanism's work has been featured in Ad Age, Creativity, and AdWeek. The agencies projects are regularly featured in major periodicals like Fast Company, The Wall Street Journal and The New York Times. On Mekanism profile, Fast Company referred to the agency's "reputation as marketing's twisted troubadours" and its ability to "...understand who they're trying to reach and how to reach them." Most recently, The New York Times called Mekanism "the Pixar of agencies."

Mekanism, along with the company's campaigns have been used by Harvard Business School as case studies in marketing and virality, most nobility included in the HBS Case Collection in 2012 in the case study "Mekanism: Engineering Viral Marketing" by Harvard professor Thales S. Teixeira.

=== Awards and recognition ===
Beyond awards for individual campaigns, Mekanism has won several awards for its achievements as a company:
