= Molly Burke =

Canadian YouTube personality (born 1994)

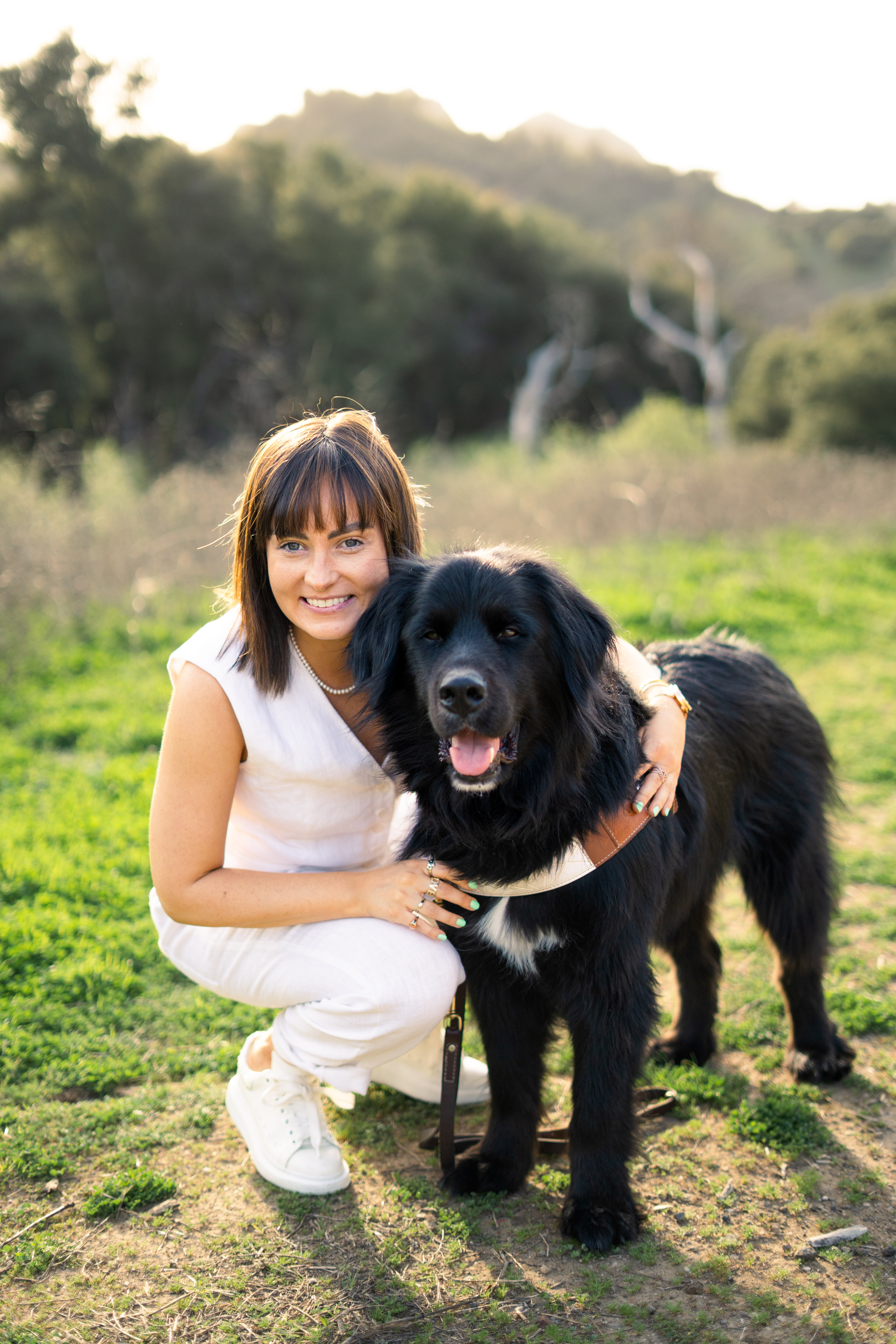
- Burke in 2025
- Born: Molly Jane Lucy Burke; February 8, 1994 (age 32); Oakville, Ontario, Canada

YouTube information
- Channel: Molly Burke
- Years active: 2015–present
- Genres: Disability; lifestyle
- Subscribers: 1.96 million
- Views: 343 million
- Last updated: March 2026
- Website: mollyburkeofficial.com

Molly Jane Lucy Burke (born February 8, 1994) is a Canadian author, award winning content creator, public speaker, consultant, model, and advocate who currently resides in Los Angeles, California.

== Biography ==
Burke was diagnosed at age four with retinitis pigmentosa, a condition which causes loss of vision. She lost most of her sight at age 14. Previously, she was a spokesperson for Foundation Fighting Blindness Canada.

Burke's content has focused on her experiences with blindness, fashion and makeup advice, and vlogs about her daily life and activities. She advocates for disability rights. She also shows her experiences with her guide dog Elton John along with her cat Lavender and her previous guide dogs, Gallop, Bennix and Gypsy.

In 2019, Burke released an audiobook on Audible, called It's Not What It Looks Like.

In 2025 Burke released her second book called Unseen: How I Lost My Vision but Found My Voice which became a USA Today bestseller and reached #1 on the Amazon Bestseller list

Burke had an interview on The Daily Show in July 2022.

== Awards and honors ==
- Helen Keller Achievement Award, 2026
- Forbes 30 Under 30, 2024
- Allure A-Lister, 2022
- Lifestyle, Shorty Awards, 2019
- Breakout YouTuber, Shorty Awards, 2018

== Filmography ==
Year	Title	Role	Notes
2022	Two Hot Takes	Podcast	Podcast
2022	The Daily Show	Herself	Episode: "3703 July 26"
2021	Off Beat:Going Blind and Being Fabolous in The City	Herself	
2022	The Great Gift Exchange	Self	
2020	Charli D'Amelio	Self	
2019	40th Media Access Award	Self	TV Special
2019	Break The ice With Adam Rippon	Self	TV Show
2019	Camp Nick	Self	TV Special
2019	11th Annual Shorty Awards	Self and Presenter	TV Show
