= Morgan Saint =

American singer-songwriter

Morgan Saint (real name Morgan Gildersleeve; born 1997 ) is a singer-songwriter from Mattituck, New York. She is signed with Epic Records.

Her debut EP, 17 Hero, came out in 2017, and her second EP, Alien in 2018, both of which have received positive reviews, and "millions of streams" Saint opened for Goldfrapp on their national tour.

In July 2020, Saint brought out the E.P. Help, "Her most personal project yet." “With the Title track HELP being featured in the Movie Songbird featuring KJ Apa and Sofia Carson

Her current LP, Out of the Blue ( Jan 2025 ) featured the released singles "Out of the Blue" and "15 Forever".

She graduated from Parsons School of Design and majored in illustration.
