= Portal A Interactive =

Digital content company

Portal A
- Type: Independent
- Industry: Media Development and Production
- Founded: 2009
- Headquarters: San Francisco, Los Angeles
- Key people: Zach Blume - Managing Partner; Nate Houghteling - Executive Producer; Kai Hasson - Creative Director
- Number of employees: 53
- Website: http://portal-a.com/

Portal A is a brand and original content company founded in 2009 by three childhood friends, Nate Houghteling, Kai Hasson, and Zach Blume. As of 2024, Portal A is independently owned and based in San Francisco, Los Angeles, and New York.

In 2019, Portal A entered into a strategic partnership with Brent Montgomery and Jimmy Kimmel's Wheelhouse Entertainment, with Wheelhouse taking a minority stake in the company.

== Original Content ==
One of the company's first projects was White Collar Brawler, an original digital series that later ran for multiple seasons on TV with the Esquire Network.

Portal A released Song Voyage, a comedy series shot in Asia following YouTube musical group The Gregory Brothers. The show was distributed by Disney's Maker Studios, and reached over 30 million views, including the viral "Chicken Attack".

The studio released One Shot with YouTube Originals in February 2018, an unscripted special with WilldaBeast Adams on a journey to find the next underground dance star. Portal A produced State of Pride for YouTube Originals, a documentary feature film directed by Rob Epstein and Jeffrey Friedman. The film premiered at the opening night of South by Southwest and was named Best Documentary at the GLAAD Awards. In 2020, Portal A released the 60-minute special Ultimate Home Championship with YouTube Originals.

Portal A produced the scripted original series Action Royale with Snapchat Originals, and released Level Up with Stephen Curry, an episodic series with Snapchat Originals and The Best Snaps Show, a daily talk show for Snapchat Originals.

Portal A developed and produced 5 Minutes From Home, a series starring Stephen Curry. The series received 6 million views over its first three episodes. Lyft sponsored the second season of 5 Minutes From Home. The company produced Year Five with Anthony Edwards and Ben Shelton's The Long Game.

In 2023, Portal A announced Moonshots, a content fund for investing in independent projects with creators. In 2024, Portal A reported that they had allocated $1m in production and staff resources to over 20 Moonshots projects, including Five Star.

== Branded Content ==
Portal A works with YouTube and Google on social video series and campaigns, and with brands like Lenovo, Target, Lego, GM, Clorox, Disney, Netflix, Warner Bros., Universal Pictures, and others.

Portal A is known for producing the annual YouTube Rewind, which has accrued over 1 billion views in aggregate since 2011. The company also produced YouTube Rewind 2018, noted as the most disliked video on YouTube.

The company has worked with Clorox for various projects, including "Best Roommate Ever" with Stephen Curry and King Bach. Portal A won the Streamy Award for Best Branded Content and Best Influencer Campaign for its work with Clorox.

Portal A's work on the "#MotoMods + YouTube Heroes" campaign for Lenovo won a One Show Pencil. Portal A's work with Lenovo includes Quest for the Impossible for Lenovo Legion and #CreatorOdyssey, a global creator campaign featuring artists from around the world. The project was named an Official Selection of BrandStorytelling at Sundance.

Portal A released Let's Target with Target featuring Laverne Cox, Tabitha Brown, Emma Chamberlain and others and works with Target on several YouTube series like Teammates of Target.

Portal A has worked on a variety of political initiatives, partnering with the Hillary Clinton 2016 campaign to reach young voters in swing states. In 2020, Portal A worked with the Joe Biden presidential campaign for the social media initiative #ImVotingFor.

== Recognition ==
Portal A was named Agency of the Year by the Streamy Awards, Brand Entertainment Agency of the Year by Campaign US, Content Agency of the Year by Digiday, Video Agency of the Year by Digiday, and Digital Studio of the Year by Cynopsis.

Portal A was profiled by Adweek as "creating branded and original content for next generation of digital", Campaign Magazine wrote that "Portal A's goal has been to help brands evolve from advertisers to content creators", and Business Insider wrote that Portal A is "a go-to for social video work for marketers" and "Portal A has found success bypassing the traditional agency model."
