= Jody Steel =

American artist

- Education: Emerson College
- Known for: Photorealistic body-paintings
- Style: Photorealism

Jody Steel is an American artist, known for her photorealistic body-paintings.

Steel depicts her illustration process in a series of timelapse videos. She became known after a classroom sketch of Breaking Bad's Walter White on her thigh gained international attention online.

Some of her other work gained over 70 million views online. Steel was a film production student at Emerson College until 2013.
