= Brisk (drink) =

Tea and juice brand

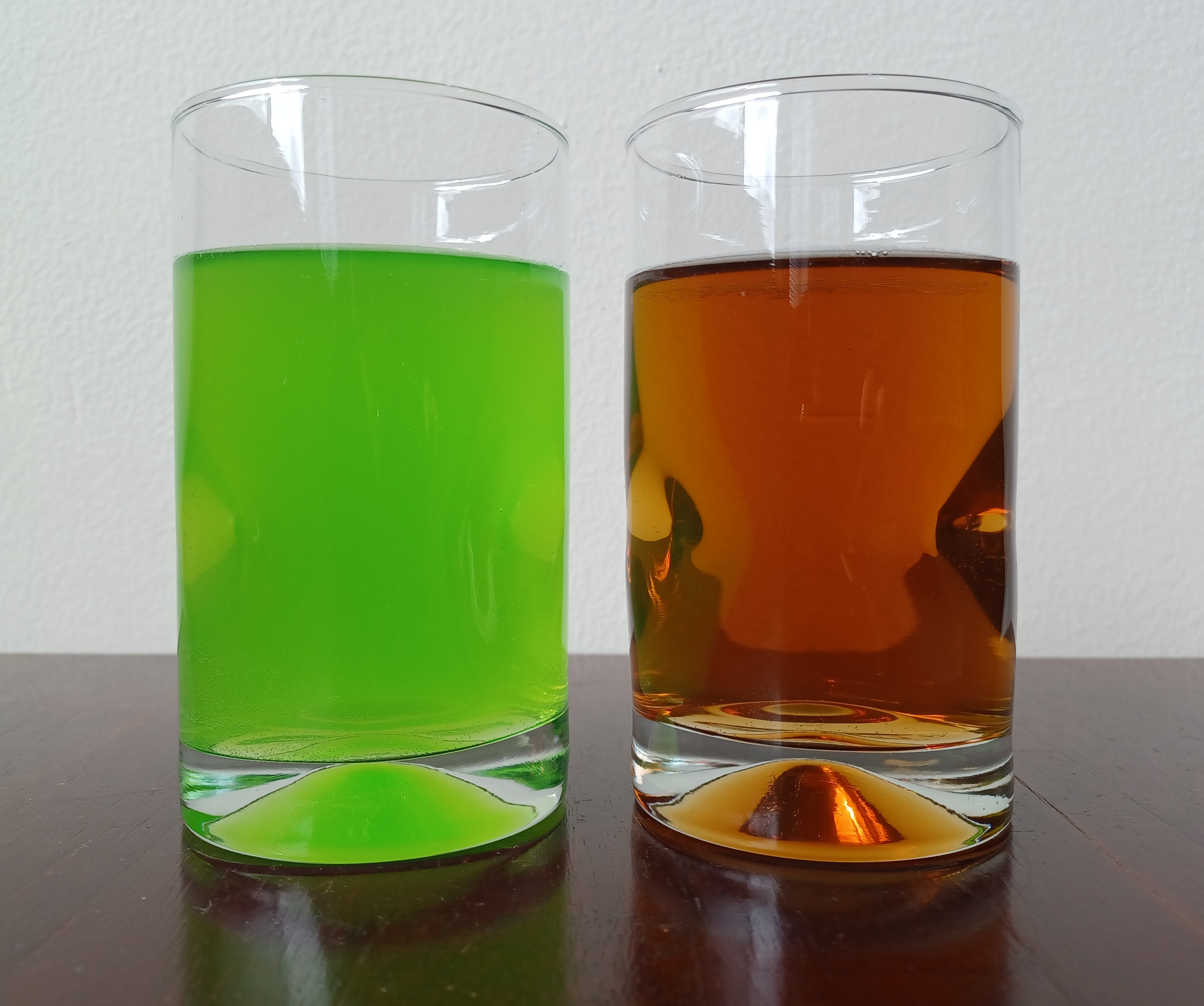
- Iced tea and watermelon lemonade (left) and lemon iced tea (right)
- Product type: Iced tea
- Current owner: PepsiCo; Unilever
- Country: U.S.
- Introduced: 1991; 35 years ago
- Markets: North America
- Website: drinkbrisk.com

Brisk is a tea and juice brand managed by the Pepsi Lipton Partnership, a joint venture founded in 1991 between PepsiCo and Unilever. In 2012, PepsiCo announced Brisk had surpassed $1 billion in annual revenue, making it one of the 22 billion-dollar PepsiCo brands.

== History ==
Prior to being reformulated, Brisk contained approximately 44 grams (11 teaspoons) of sugars per 16-ounce can. Since being reformulated with sucralose, the amount of sugars has been reduced in most varieties by approximately half.

Lipton previously had a slogan of long standing, "the brisk tea". Brisk is well known for its high-profile “That’s Brisk, baby!” campaigns. The J. Walter Thompson ad agency first launched the campaign in 1996, featuring pop-culture icons in claymation, and was revived in 2010 by creative agency Mekanism. The advertisements highlight exhausted celebrities who are dramatically reinvigorated by drinking Brisk. Frank Sinatra (voiced by Joe Piscopo), Babe Ruth, Reggie Jackson, Elvis Presley, James Brown, Coolio, Willie Nelson, Bruce Lee, Danny DeVito, Bruce Willis, Ozzy Osbourne, Sylvester Stallone (who voiced himself as Rocky Balboa), Danny Trejo, Eminem, and Doja Cat have all been featured in Brisk spots.

In an effort to compete with the Arizona Beverage Company's line of 99-cent iced tea cans, Lipton Brisk expanded its line of products in 2010 and lowered the price of its one-liter bottles to 99 cents. Brisk currently offers lemon iced tea, raspberry iced tea, sweet tea, peach green tea, green tea with mango dragonfruit, diet tea with lemon, fusion iced tea with lemonade, honey and ginseng iced tea, fusion white tea with pink lemonade, strawberry melon, fruit punch, lemonade, and diet lemonade.
