= Vanessa Baden =

American actress, writer, director, and producer

Vanessa Baden-Kelly
- Born: Vanessa Jennifer Baden; September 8, 1985 (age 41); Manhattan Beach, California, U.S.
- Occupations: Actress, writer, director, producer
- Years active: 1994–present
- Spouse: RJ Kelly (m. 2013)
- Children: 1

Vanessa Jennifer Baden-Kelly (/ˈbeɪdən/; born September 8, 1985) is an American actress, writer, director, and producer. She is best known as a child actress in the Nickelodeon television series Gullah Gullah Island (1994–1998) and Kenan & Kel (1996–2000). In 2017, she co-wrote, co-produced, and starred in the web series Giants, executive produced by Issa Rae. In 2019, she won a Daytime Emmy Award for her performance in Giants.

She was the executive story editor and writer for season 1 of The Sex Lives of College Girls.

== Early life ==
Baden was born in Manhattan Beach, California, and raised in Satellite Beach, Florida, where she got her start as a model in print ads.

In 2004, she won the Florida District Miss Black and Gold Pageant, representing the Iota Delta chapter of Alpha Phi Alpha fraternity at a regional competition in Atlanta, Georgia. She graduated from Florida State University in Tallahassee, Florida in December 2007 with a degree in sociology.

== Career ==
Baden began her career as a child actress on television; her first major role was as Vanessa in the Nick Jr. television series Gullah Gullah Island. Following this, she portrayed Kyra Rockmore for more than 60 episodes of the teen sitcom Kenan & Kel, which also aired on Nickelodeon.

In 1997, she played a supporting role in the film Rosewood and served as a panelist on the children's game show Figure It Out. This was followed by a year-long hiatus from acting.

In 2011, Baden returned to the screen as Hope in the YouTube comedy series Fail, opposite King Bach. In 2012, she starred as Erin Mult in the television film Chris & Todd. In 2014, she played opposite Jenifer Lewis in the comedy feature film Secrets of the Magic City, directed by R. Malcolm Jones.

Since 2017, she has starred, co-written, and co-produced the web series Giants, which streams on Issa Rae's YouTube channel. She plays Journee in the series. Her performance in Giants garnered her a Daytime Emmy Award nomination for Outstanding Lead Actress in 2018, and a win in 2019.

Baden has also written for The Huffington Post.

In May 2021, Baden's essay collection, Far Away from Close to Home: A Black Millennial Woman in Progress, was published by Three Rooms Press.

== Filmography ==
Key
†	Denotes works that have not yet been released

=== Film ===
Year	Title	Writer	Director	Executive producer	Actor	Role	Notes
1997	Rosewood	No	No	No	Yes	Lee-Ruth	
2012	Franchise	No	No	No	Yes	Cameo	Short film
2014	Secrets of the Magic City	No	No	No	Yes	Tracey	
2017	Other	Yes	No	Yes	No	—N/a	Short film

=== Television ===
==== Acting credits ====
Year	Title	Role	Notes
1994–1995	My Brother and Me	Janey	3 episodes
1994–1998	Gullah Gullah Island	Vanessa/Vixen	Main role
1996–2000	Kenan & Kel	Kyra Rockmore	Main role
2011–2012	Fail	Hope	Recurring role
2013	Chris & Todd	Erin Mult	Television film
2017–2018	Giants	Journee	Web series; Main role

==== Other credits ====
Year	Title	Writer	Executive producer	Notes
1997	Figure It Out	No	No	Herself / Panelist
2011–2012	Fail	Yes	Yes	2 episodes; also director
2017–2018	Giants	Yes	Co-producer	2 episodes
2019	Soap Central	No	No	Herself / Interviewee
2019–2022	Animal Kingdom	Yes	No	4 episodes
2021	Guilty Party	Yes	No	1 episode
2021–2024	The Sex Lives of College Girls	Yes	Consulting	2 episodes
2024	Lady in the Lake	No	Co-executive	
2025	The Morning Show	Yes	Co-executive	1 episode
2026	The Terror: Devil in Silver	Yes	Co-executive	1 episode
2026	Lanterns	Yes	Co-executive	2 episodes
