= NeueHouse =

American office sharing company

- Type: Private
- Industry: Office sharing
- Founded: New York (2011)
- Founders: Joshua Abram; Alan Murray; James O'Reilly
- Headquarters: New York, United States
- Area served: New York
- Key people: Ryan Simonetti (CEO and President 2026-current)
- Parent: Convene Hospitality Group (CHG)
- Website: NeueHouse.com

NeueHouse (pronounced “noy-ya house,” with “neue” meaning “new” in German) is a private event and workspace collective that curates a community of entrepreneurs and businesses across industries in New York City. NeueHouse operates its headquarters in a 115,000-square-foot building at 110 East 25th St. in Manhattan, New York. The eight-story building features an 80-seat screening room, a penthouse event space, private and flexible workspaces on multiple floors, a podcast recording room, and a schedule of members-only cultural programming.

The event and workspace has celebrity and elite international members across the film, fashion, tech, music, and other creative industries, while the event space has hosted screenings and premieres for Disney, Paramount, and CAA, among others, after opening two locations in Los Angeles.

On September 5, 2025, the company ceased operations at all three locations, citing "legacy liabilities." The sudden closure occurred one month after co-founder Joshua Abram died, according to an obituary in The New York Times.

The NeueHouse brand reemerged in January 2026 to announce a change in ownership after being acquired by Convene Hospitality Group (CHG), which resumed operations at the Madison Square flagship in New York. The parent company CHG owns several brands as part of its portfolio of meeting, event, and workplace venues in the U.S. and UK, including Convene for premium event and flexible work spaces, and etc.venues, a network of venues for small offsite meetings.

== History ==
=== Founding ===
NeueHouse was founded in 2011 by Joshua Abram, Alan Murray and James O'Reilly. Its first workspace opened in May 2013 in New York alongside a hardcover print publication named NeueJournal. In 2015, the company raised $25 million venture funding by Great Eagle Holdings. By 2017, the founding trio sold their majority stake in NeueHouse, leaving controlling interest to investors, including the high-profile couple Diane von Furstenberg and Barry Diller.

The company expanded to cater to the creative industries in Los Angeles, one in Hollywood in 2015 and another in Venice Beach in 2022.

In 2018, the company secured an additional $30 million in funding, said to include additional investment from Diller and Von Furstemberg and from a Hong Kong-based real estate investment firm. Investors also brought in Josh Wyatt as chief executive officer, a former private equity and hotel executive. At the time of the announcement, Wyatt told the Wall Street Journal that NeueHouse had 1,500 members with “long waiting lists” across its three locations, and the team was “in talks” for locations in Toronto and San Francisco.

=== Financial troubles ===
NeueHouse was teetering on the edge of insolvency even before the COVID-19 pandemic hit in 2020. Drained by massive leases and overhead, the company later admitted it was “burdened by legacy liabilities,” leaving it virtually out of cash. By early 2020, the firm was reportedly scouting for a buyer or an emergency cash infusion to stay afloat.

NeueHouse averted collapse in July 2020 when German real estate heir Yoram Roth stepped in. Roth acquired the struggling brand for $35 million, folding it into his photography museum, Fotografiska, to form a new parent entity called CultureWorks. This merger was a bid to stabilize operations through Roth’s belief that “community” was the “secret sauce” needed to salvage the business, as reported by The Los Angeles Times.

=== Bankruptcy ===
NeueHouse faced financial challenges despite the several rounds of venture funding, reaching a reported $83.7 million in debt by March 2025. On September 3, 2025, the company posted a notice stating that "legacy liabilities" left it unable to continue operations and that all three locations would remain open only for members to collect belongings until September 5 at 5:00 p.m. ET. The company said it planned to file for Chapter 7 bankruptcy the same month as the closure. The shutdown affected all three locations in Manhattan, Hollywood and Venice Beach.

Former executives cited high costs of lease, unsuccessful restaurant operations, and excessive spending on expansion as primary factors for the company’s instability. In early 2025, internal financial documents revealed that NeueHouse’s total debt had reached $83.7 million.

=== Convene Acquisition ===
Convene Hospitality Group launched in September 2025, the same month it started its acquisition of NeueHouse, but the parent company’s hospitality portfolio imbues decades of industry experience. CHG united NeueHouse with Convene, a collection of meeting, event, and work space venues co-founded in 2009 by current CEO Ryan Simonetti and Chris Kelly, who left the company in 2019. Convene opened its first international venue in 2022 at 22 Bishopsgate in London. In 2023, Convene acquired etc.venues for $250 million, a legacy meetings and corporate trainings provider founded in 1992 and based in the UK and New York.

CHG President and CEO Ryan Simonetti told Business Travel News at the time of the acquisition announcement that the hospitality company plans to expand the reinvigorated NeueHouse brand to “preserve and nurture this existing community and “build upon this legacy.” The NeueHouse Madison Square location is the only reopened location, and CHG said there are no plans to reopen the former Los Angeles venues. CHG did express plans for the continued development of the NeueHouse brand within its portfolio.

The house of brands continued its expansion by raising $230 million in financial funding in April 2026, led by TPG global asset manager and equity investment from existing shareholders through Ares Management.

== Locations ==
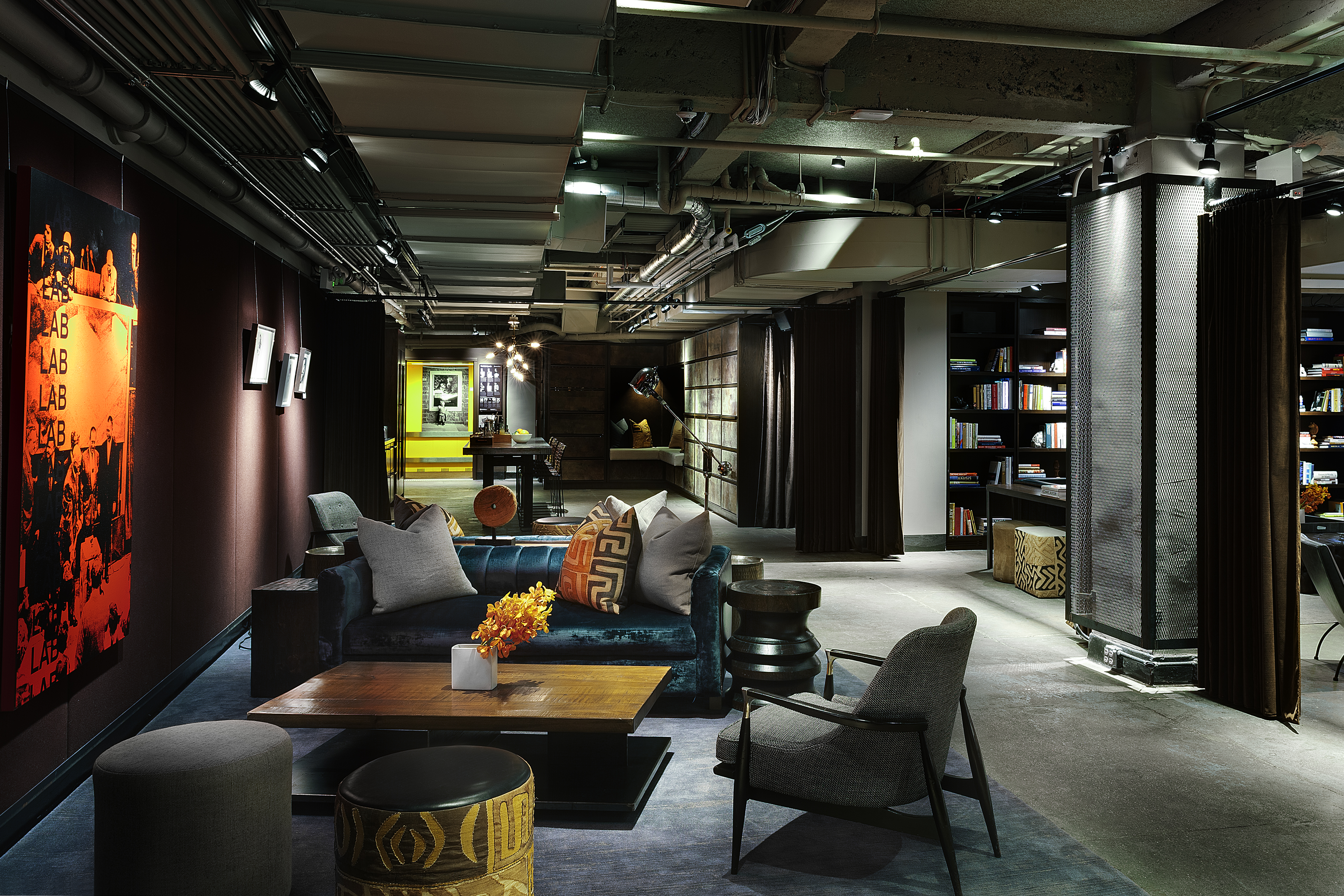
The library at NeueHouse in Madison Square.

=== Manhattan ===
NeueHouse Madison Square is located in 110 East 25th Street in Manhattan. The New York building was designed by architect David Rockwell, known for its global projects such as Nobu restaurants. The Madison Square location is notable for its carefully curated environment in the eight-floor, 50,000-square-foot building with exposed brick and industrial lamps, giving a mix of boutique hotel and eclectic-chic aesthetic.

The modern layout goes beyond concrete floors due to a variety of work and lounge areas: retro library tables, amphitheater-style seating with kilim-covered cushions for meet-ups, and nooks designed for conversation, like leather sofas with coffee tables. The interior is purposeful in its aspirations to foster social moments along with productivity, according to architect David Rockwell, “The design strategy is a typology that looks at accidental encounters, as much as organizational clarity or efficiency.”

The ground floor gallery is designed for special gatherings, networking, and receptions, complete with spacious 20-foot ceilings and Spanish-style amphitheater seating in its center for performances and informal meetups. The Rockwell Group also redesigned the basement cinema with an expanded 80-person capacity and 1960s Italian decor as its influence.

The NeueHouse Madison Square Penthouse is a 6,200 square-foot area with views of the Manhattan skyline and capacity for 240 people. The top-floor venue allows for multi-directional natural light and is equipped with technology like sound equipment, a retractable screen, and truss lighting.

=== Los Angeles ===
Previous NeueHouse locations in Los Angeles included 93,000 square feet at CBS Columbia Square in Hollywood, a mixed-use project built on the former CBS Los Angeles broadcast studio. The company leased the CBS Columbia Square building and opened in October 2015. In 2021, the company hosted several movie premieres in the Hollywood location, including the Netflix remake "He's All That."

In 2021 NeueHouse opened on the second floor of the Bradbury Building in Downtown Los Angeles. Grappling with the challenges of the COVID-19 pandemic, NeueHouse chose to exit its lease at the Bradbury Building in late 2023 as a strategic move to curb further financial losses.

In December 2022, a third Los Angeles location opened in Venice Beach. Debuting in 2022, the Venice Beach outpost of NeueHouse took up residence in a two-story structure from the 1920s, situated close to Los Angeles' seaside creative hub. This location served as a key component of the brand's broader plan to grow its “fledgling empire of cool” throughout the city.

All Los Angeles NeueHouse locations permanently closed in September 2025 when the company changed ownership.

== Services ==
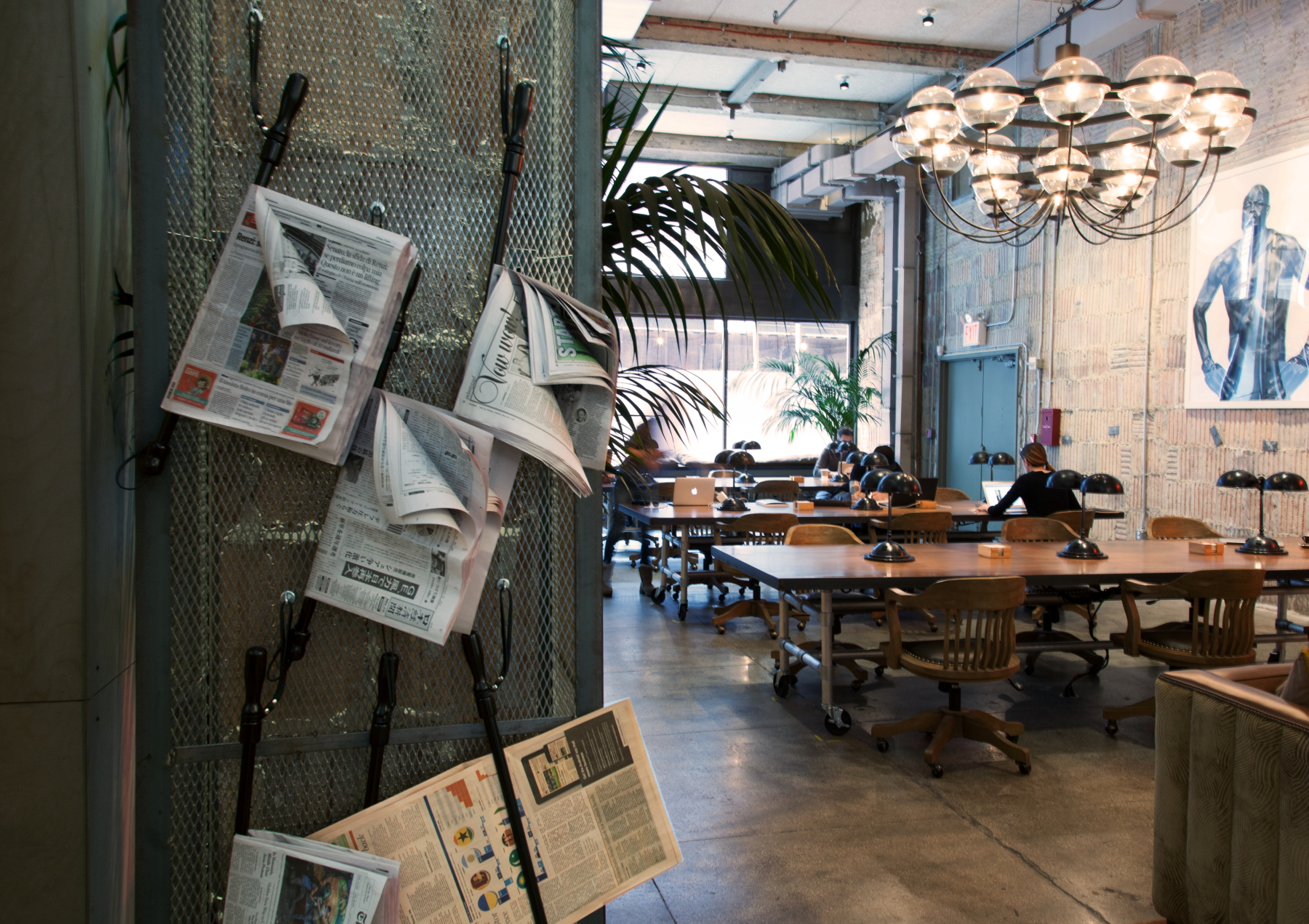
The gallery at NeueHouse in Madison Square.

NeueHouse provides work, social and meeting space to businesses and individual creative entrepreneurs operating in the film, fashion, design, publishing, arts and other various sectors.

NeueHouse Madison Square features five meeting and event spaces, including a penthouse for up to 225, conference rooms, an 80-person cinema, a podcast recording studio, and the ground floor gallery accommodating up to 235 people. Event services include in-house catering, specialty bars, AV equipment and technicians, and WiFi.

The company organizes live events including content releases and cultural programming. NeueHouse has also held several movie premieres in the former Los Angeles location.

Memberships include a variety of options, such as flexible seating in the gallery with an open seating floor plan, and build up to private studios with space for multiple people. The ongoing cultural programming for members includes musical performances, lectures, artist talks, and film screenings.

Event information and membership at NeueHouse Madison Square can be requested through the website since the company doesn’t list prices publicly. Varied monthly membership tiers with part-time flexible seating memberships starting at $300 and unlimited access at $600 monthly.
