= Jason Harris (marketer) =

American businessperson

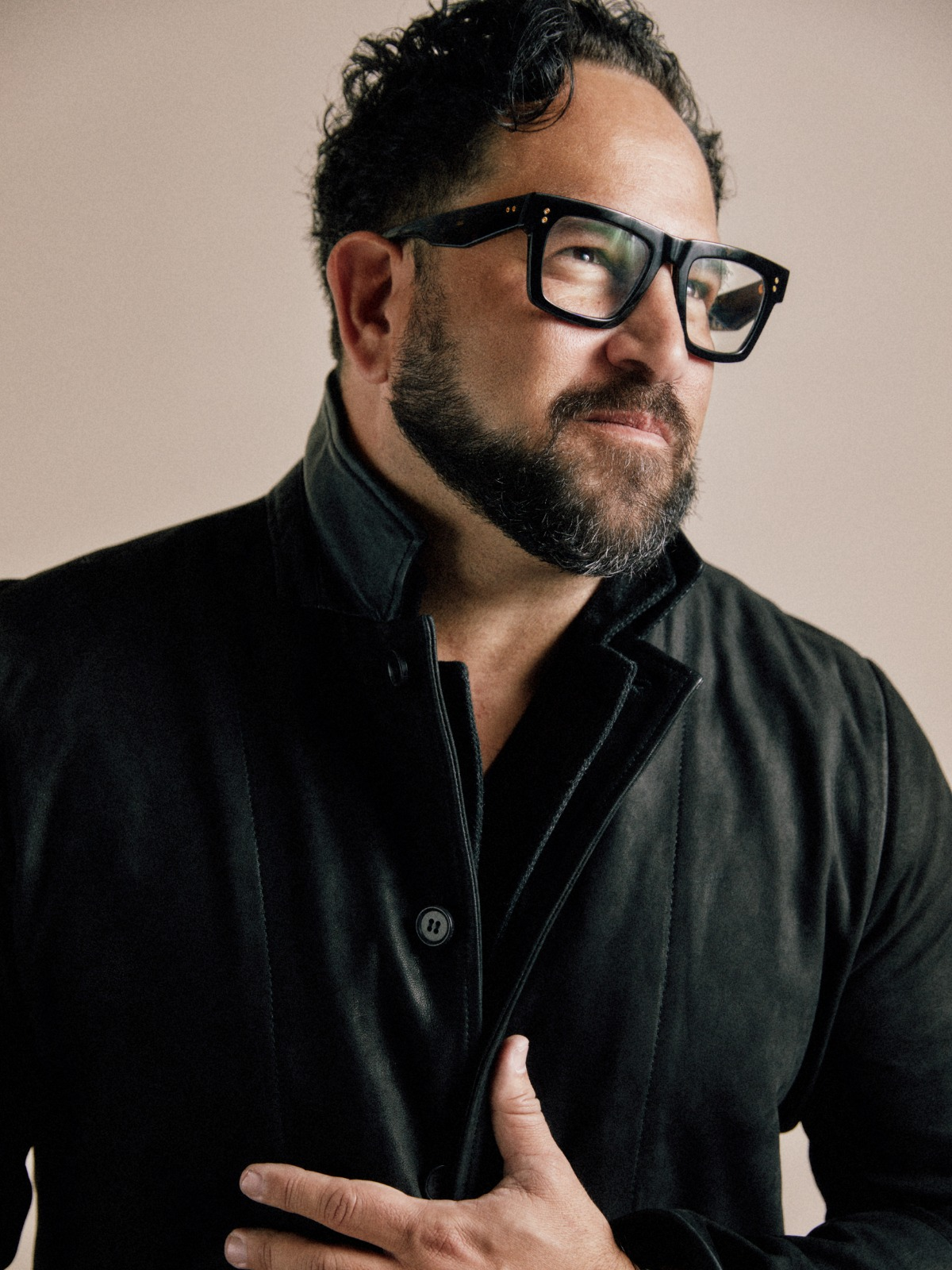
- Born: Fairfax, Virginia, U.S.
- Education: James Madison University (Bachelor of Business Administration)
- Occupation: Founder /Entrepreneur

Jason Harris is an American entrepreneur. He is the Co-founder / CEO of Mekanism Inc., an award-winning creative advertising agency, author of The Soulful Art of Persuasion and host of the award-winning podcast, Soul and Science.

== Education ==
He earned his degree in Bachelor of Business Administration from James Madison University.

== Career ==
Harris is the co-founder and CEO of Mekanism, an award-winning creative agency. He began his career in business and strategy roles at agencies like TBWA\Chiat\Day, Leagas Delaney, and Ketchum, where he led major campaigns for clients including PlayStation, Levi’s, and Disney.

Harris later founded Plan C, an entertainment company focused on branded TV content, producing work for Adidas and Xbox that aired nationally on Fox Sports. He is the author of The Soulful Art of Persuasion, a Wall Street Journal bestselling book that explores strategies for authentic communication, empathy, and storytelling in business and leadership. The book emphasizes connecting with audiences in a genuine, human-centered way, and has been cited as a resource for marketers, entrepreneurs, and business leaders seeking to build trust and achieve lasting influence.

In addition to his writing, Harris hosts the podcast Soul & Science, an award-winning series in which he interviews prominent chief marketing officers, brand strategists, and cultural leaders. The podcast focuses on the intersection of emotional intelligence and data-driven decision-making in marketing and brand development.

=== Mekanism ===
Since joining Mekanism as Cofounder and CEO, Harris has helped grow the agency into one of the top midsize creative shops in the U.S., leading campaigns for brands like HBO, The North Face, Muscle Milk, Ben & Jerry’s, and PepsiCo. Under his leadership, Mekanism clients include Alaska Airlines, Quaker, Charles Schwab, Jose Cuervo, Ben & Jerrys, Amtrak, Cupcake Vineyards, and most recently, Custom Ink and Noom.

During his tenure Mekanism earned spots on Ad Age’s A-List, being named one of the Top 10 Most Effective Agencies in the U.S. by the Effie Index and the agency was also spotlighted leaders in Adweek’s Creative 100: Rising Agency Talent You’ll Want to Remember, (2024) and Campaign Us’s 40 Over 40 List. Notably, in 2014, the agency led the White House’s “It’s On Us” campaign to combat campus sexual assault. In 2015, Harris oversaw the acquisition of Epic Signal, a digital content studio that has partnered with brands like Bud Light and NBC to run campaigns across platforms like YouTube, Snapchat, and Instagram.

In 2025, Jason spearheaded the launch of an AI creative studio called the AI Superstudio. In 2026, the studio was shortlisted as AI Studio of the year by Campaign.

== Awards ==
During Harris' time as CEO, the agency has twice been named the "Small Agency of the Year" by Ad Age, won four Effie Awards, three Cannes Lions Awards, three London International Awards, a D&AD Award, and four Webby Awards. Mekanism has also been listed as one of the top 50 most creative companies by Creativity magazine. In January 2015, the company was named to Advertising Age's A List and was named one of the most effective Independent Agencies in America later that year.

In 2018, Harris was named to the Top 100 Influencers in 2018 by Creative Pool, an online resource for agencies, brands and individuals.

In 2014, Mekanism created an ad for Pepsi which ran during the Super Bowl and was ranked by USA Today as the tenth best Super Bowl ad that year. Mekanism was named as one of Advertising Age's best places to work in 2016.

In 2021, Harris was named CEO of the Year by The Drum, included in Campaign US’s 40 Over 40, and listed on the 4A’s 100 People Who Make Advertising Great— noting his biggest drive is helping people and brands connect in more human, soulful ways. The agency also ranked among the Top 10 Most Effective Independent Agencies in the U.S., according to the Effie Index. At the Signal Awards, he won two Silver Awards and the Listener’s Choice Award in 2023, followed by a Bronze Award and another Listener’s Choice Award in 2024, and a Bronze Award with Listener’s Choice honors in 2025. In addition, he received a Silver Award at the 2023 W3 Awards, acknowledging excellence in digital content and media.

== Influence ==
Harris serves on the board of directors for Advertising Week and is an advising member of the Marketing 50 Group. He is also a co-chair and founding member of the Civic Nation Creative Alliance, a partnership with The White House focused on driving social impact through creative initiatives. In addition to his professional roles, Harris is a board and chair member of the New York Zen Center, where he engages in mindfulness and meditation practices that influence his leadership and creative approach. In 2017, the American Association of Advertising Agencies (4As) named Harris one of the "100 People Who Make Advertising Great."

The following year, he delivered the commencement address at his alma mater, James Madison University.
