= 11th Streamy Awards =

2021 awards ceremony recognizing online video

- Date: December 11, 2021
- Location: Los Angeles, California
- Presented by: Streamys Blue Ribbon Panel

Highlights
- Most awards: Bretman Rock, Bailey Sarian, Mark Rober, MrBeast, The Game Theorists (2 each)
- Most nominations: MrBeast (7)
- Year Awards: 30 Days With: Bretman Rock (Show of the Year); MrBeast (Creator of the Year)

Television/radio coverage
- Network: YouTube
- Viewership: 9.6 million
- Produced by: MRC Live & Alternative; Tubefilter

The 11th Annual Streamy Awards was the eleventh installment of the Streamy Awards honoring the best in American streaming television series and their creators. The ceremony was held on December 11, 2021, hosted by Larray and livestreamed exclusively to YouTube. Larray hosted the show from a party bus in Los Angeles alongside special guest Issa Twaimz. The show continued the Creator Honor awards, introduced the previous year, which featured past Streamy award winners presenting the award to creators that resonated with them in 2021. It also featured sneak-peaks of YouTube videos by creators such as Dixie D'Amelio, Lexi Rivera, RDCWorld, Safiya Nygaard, and ZHC, including a preview of Markiplier's YouTube Originals interactive special In Space with Markiplier. MrBeast's Team Seas fundraising initiative to clean oceans, rivers and beaches was highlighted during a special segment of the show.

== Performers ==
The 11th Streamy Awards featured the musical performances of the following artists:

Performers at the 11th Streamy Awards
Artist(s)	Song(s)
Ari Lennox	"Pressure"
Måneskin	"Beggin'"

== Winners and nominees ==
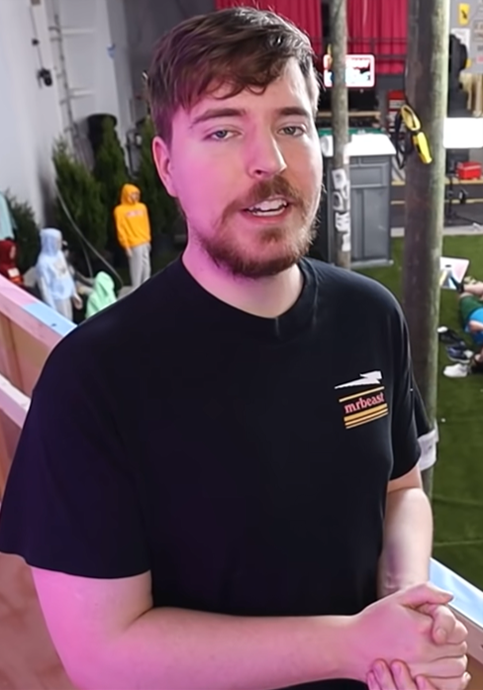
MrBeast, winner of Creator of the Year and the Nonprofit or NGO Social Good Award

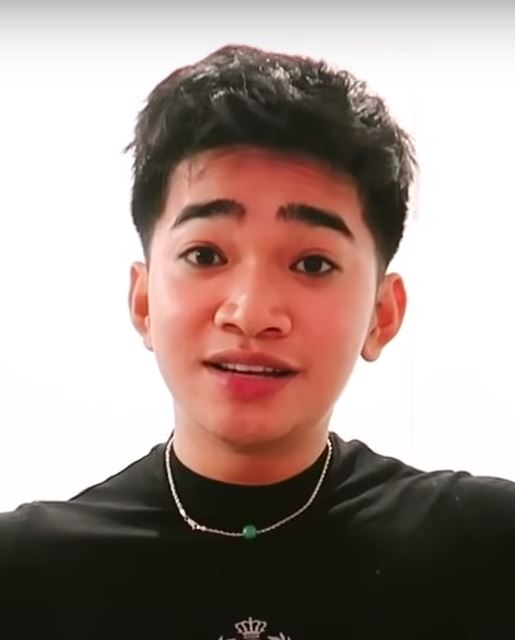
Bretman Rock, winner of Show of the Year and Best Unscripted Series

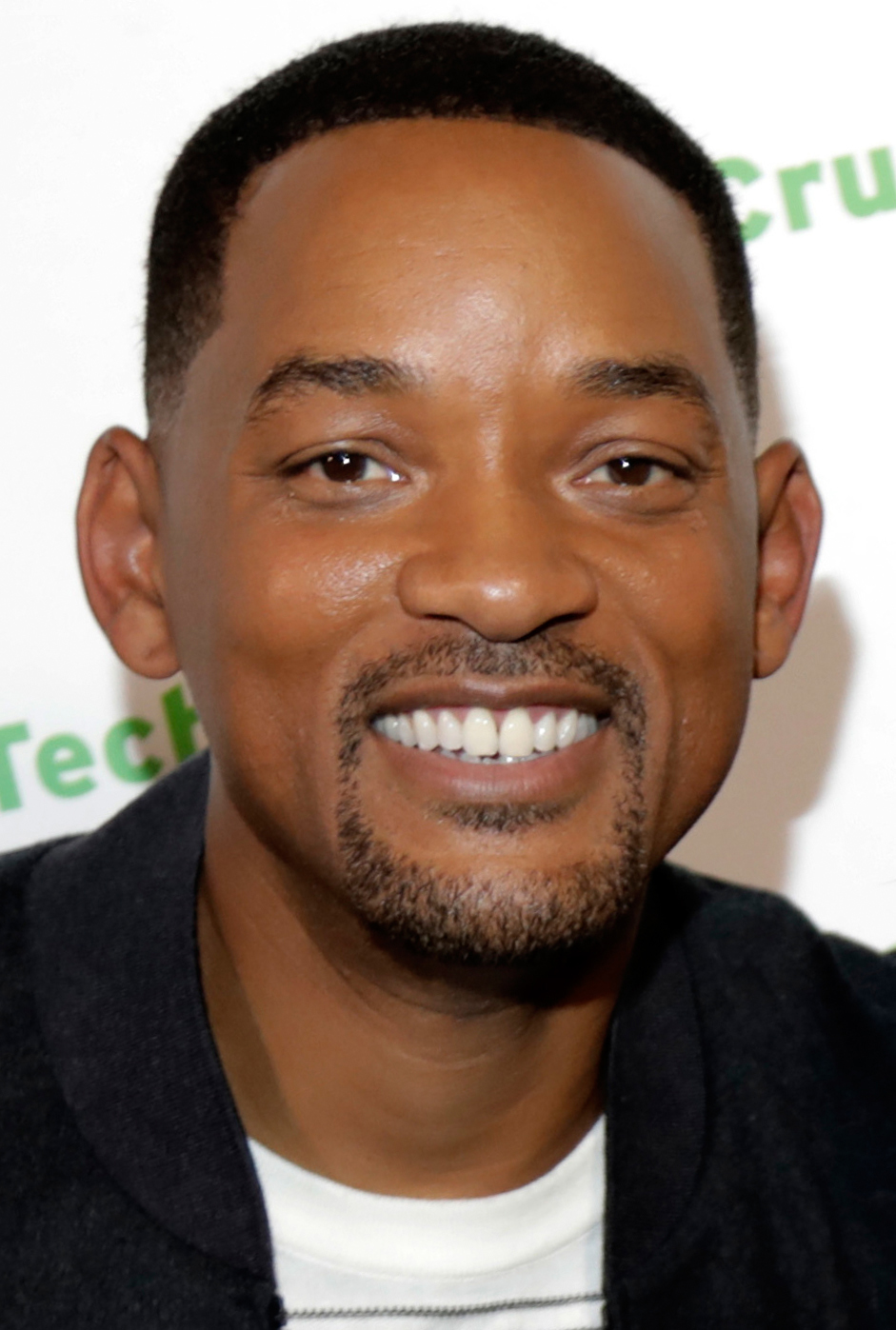
Will Smith, winner of Best Crossover

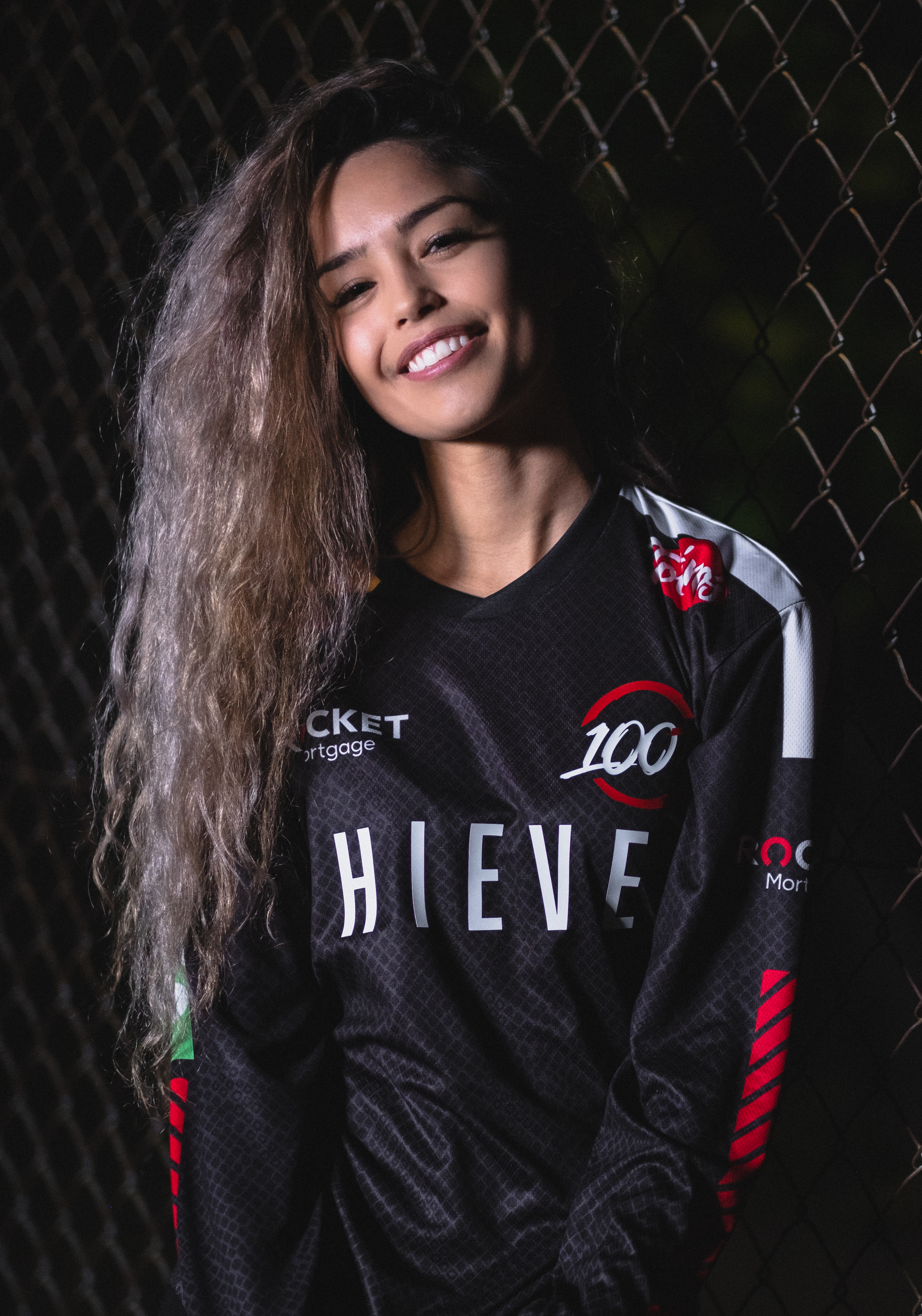
Valkyrae, winner of Best Livestreamer

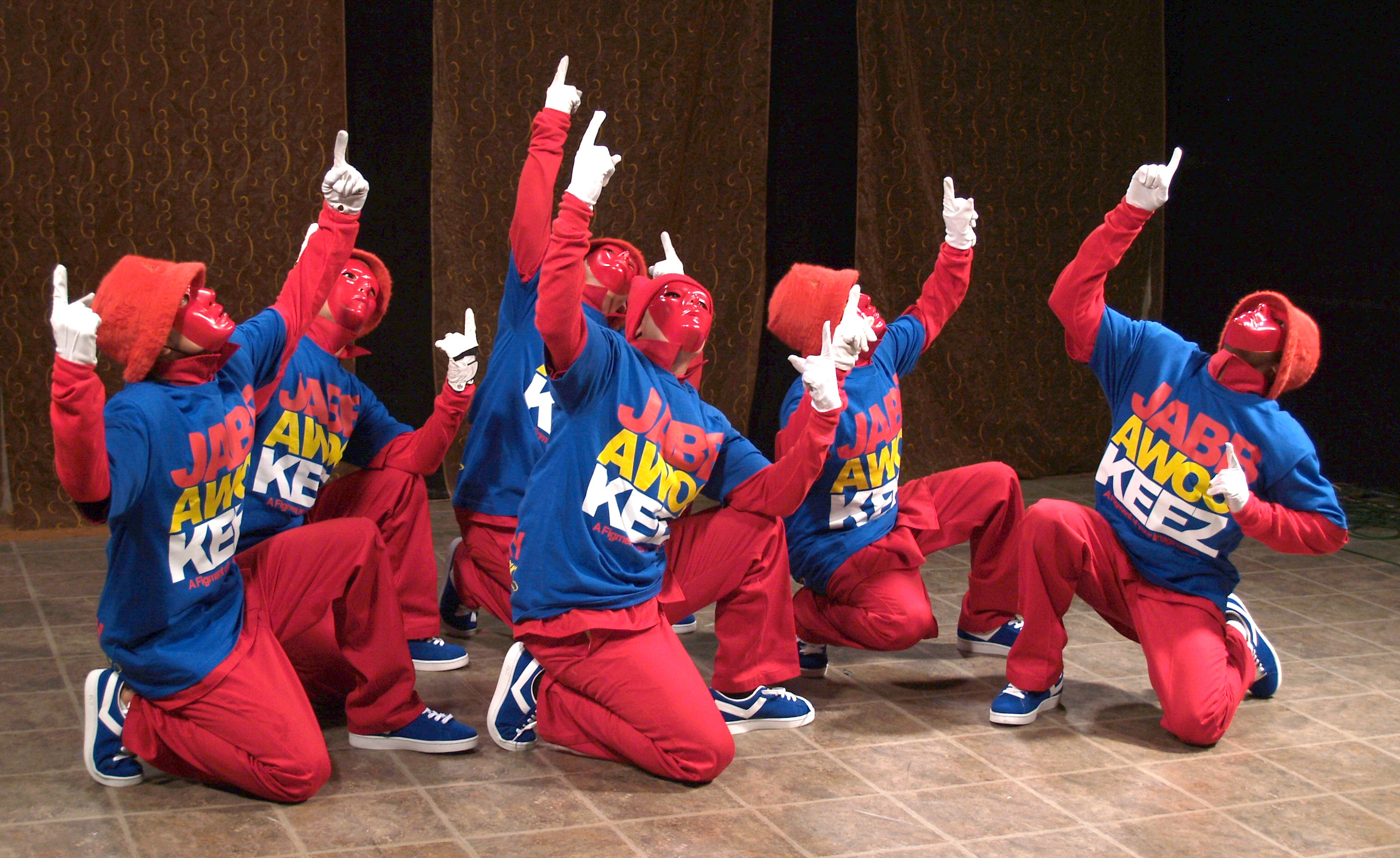
Jabbawockeez, winner of the Dance category

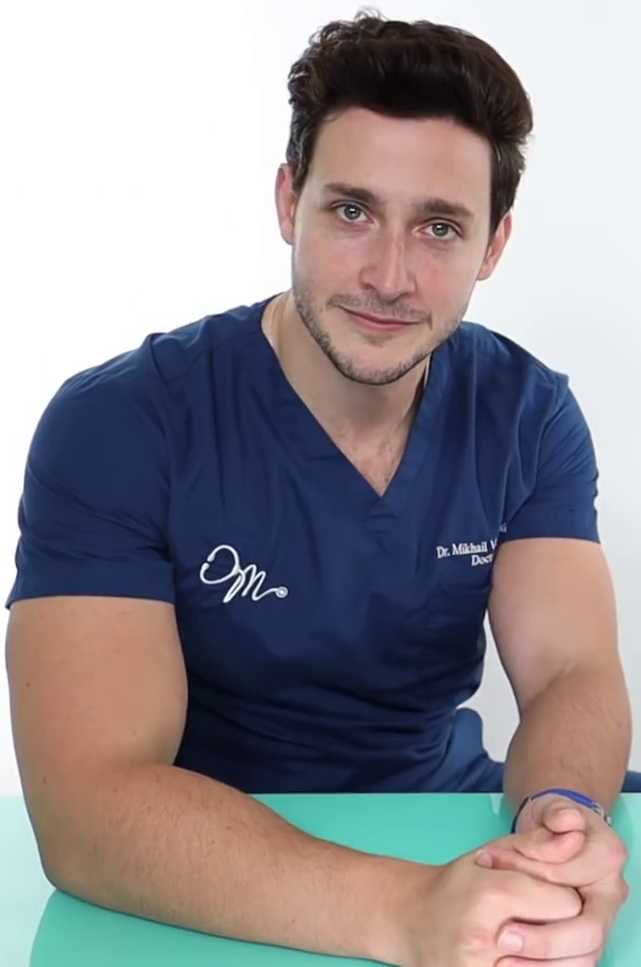
Doctor Mike, winner of the Health and Wellness category

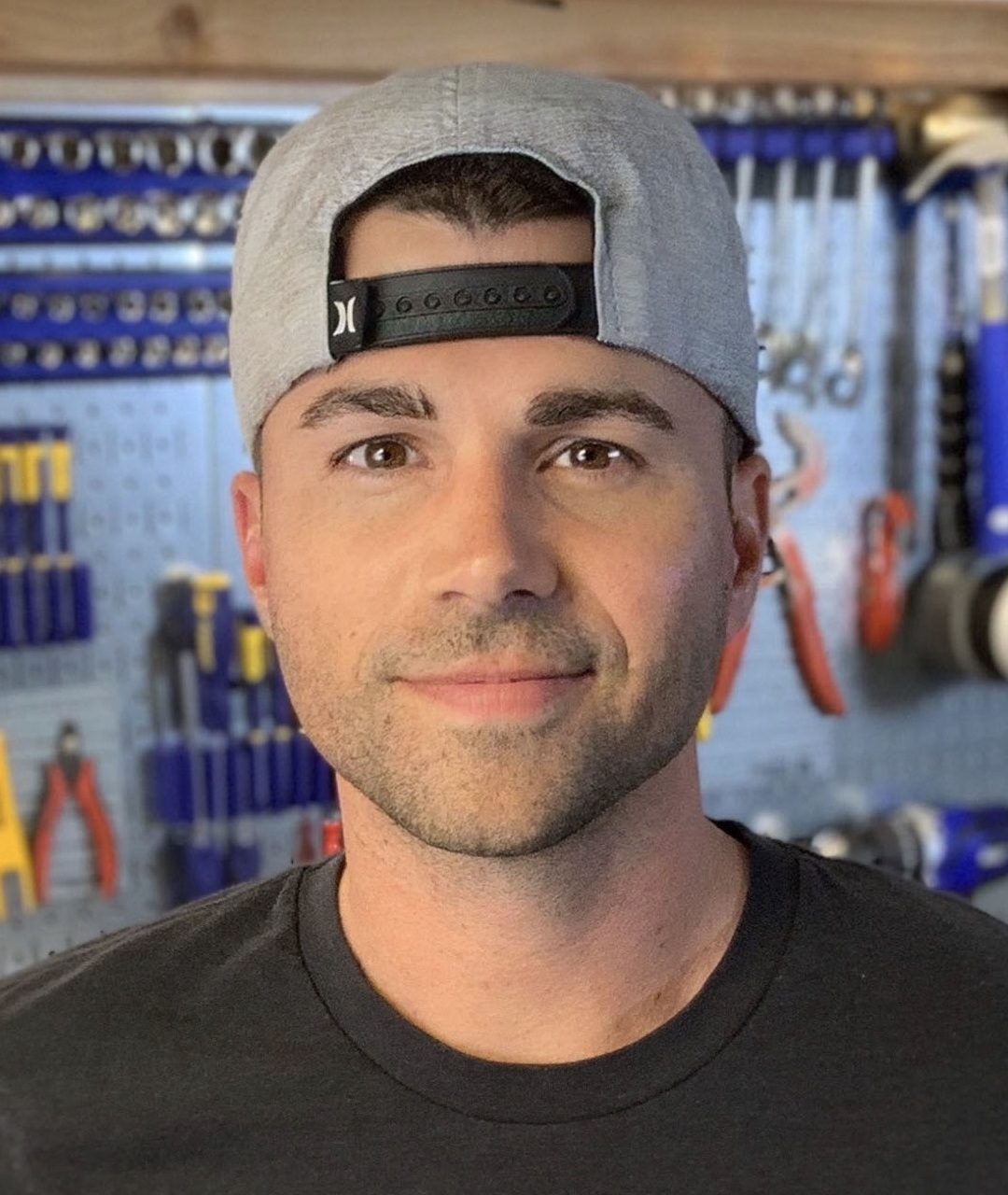
Mark Rober, winner of the Science and Engineering category and the Nonprofit or NGO Social Good Award

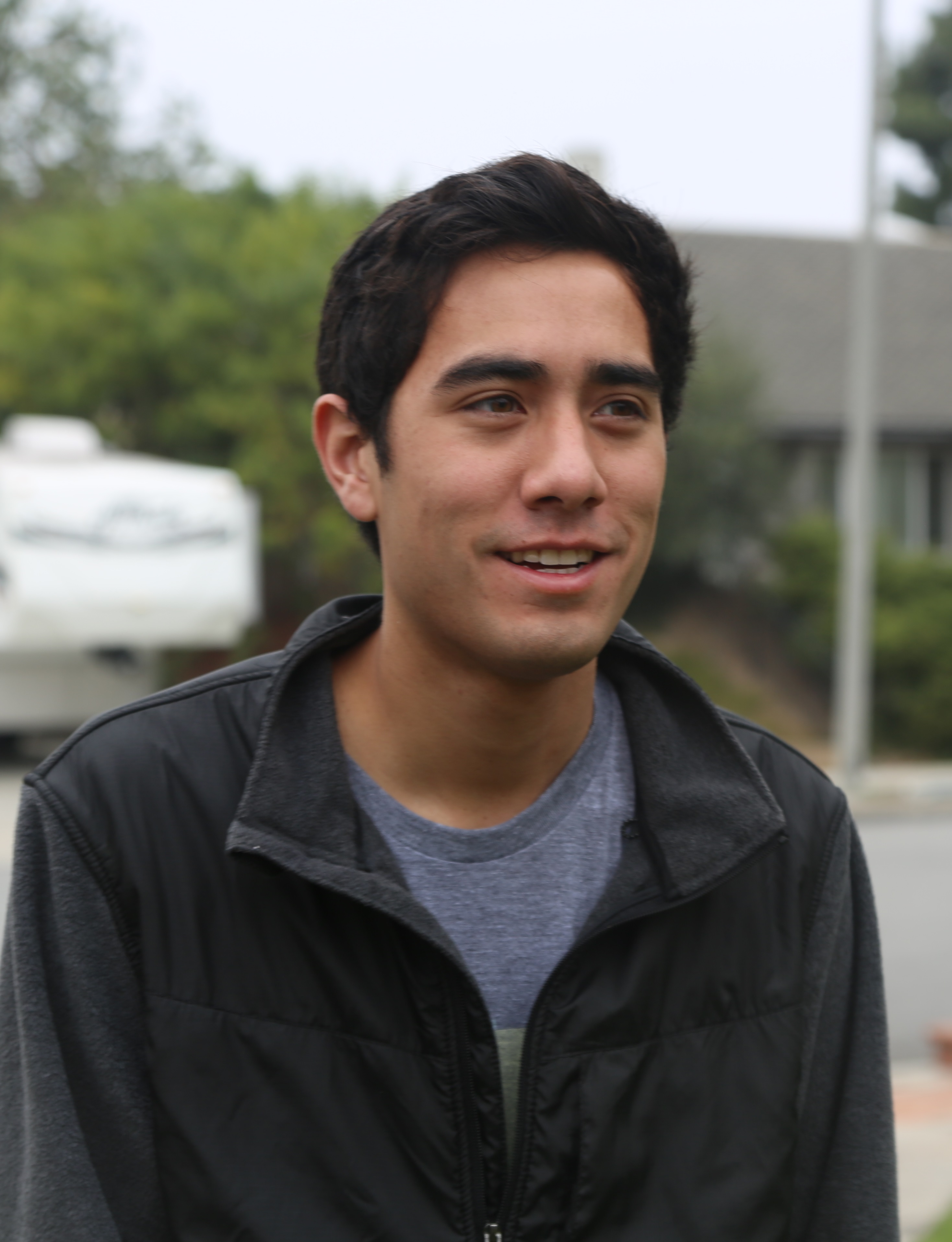
Zach King, winner of Best Visual and Special Effects

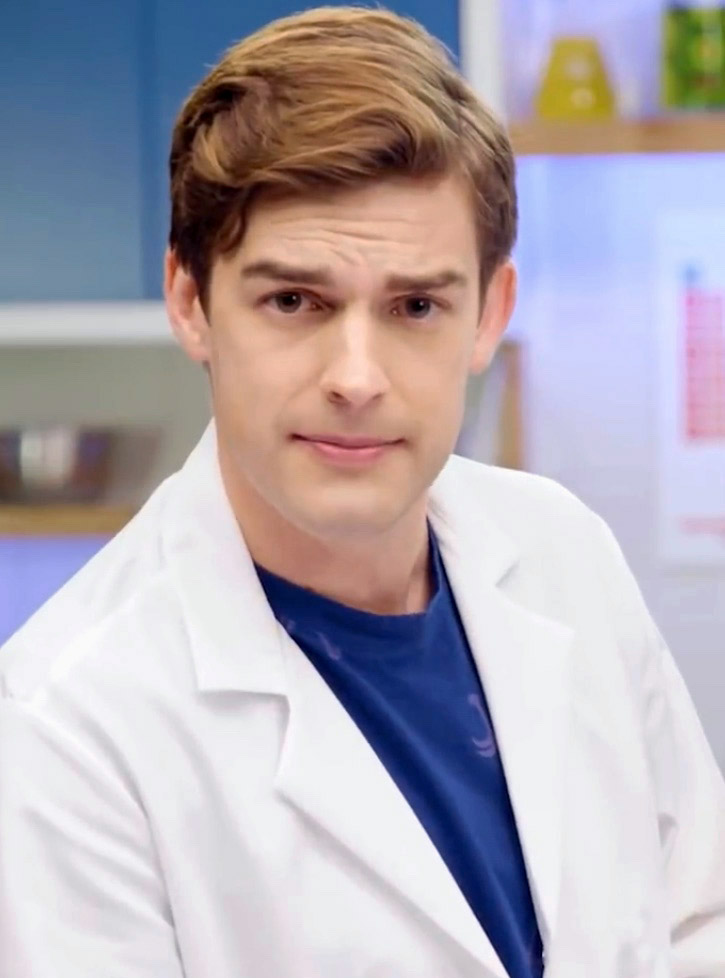
MatPat of The Game Theorists, winner of Best Writing and the Company or Brand Social Good Award

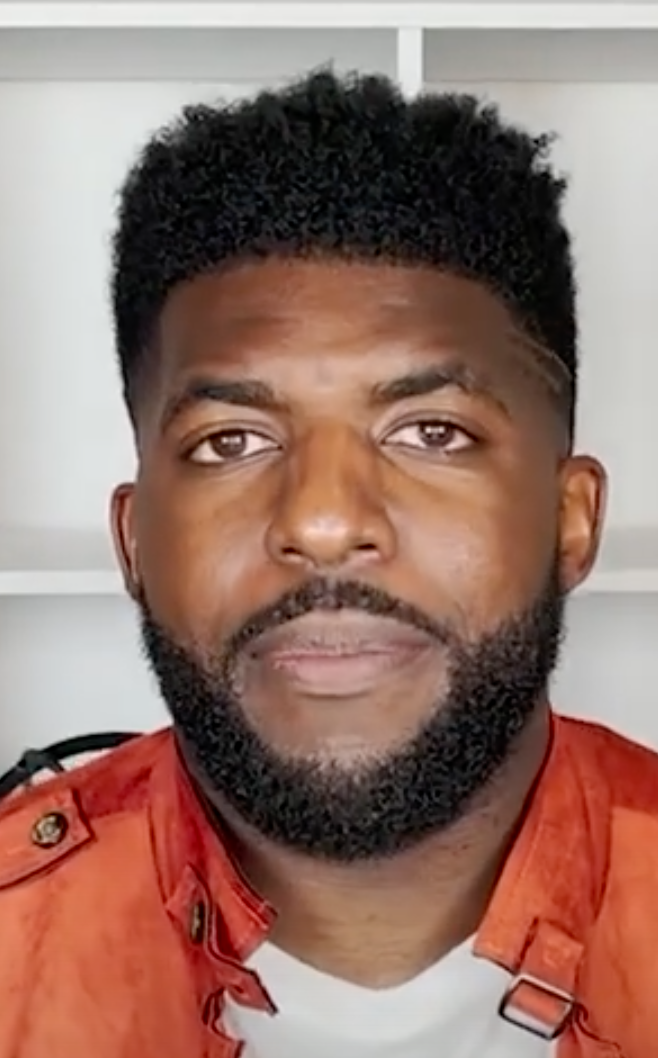
Emmanuel Acho, winner of the Creator Social Good Award

The nominees were announced on October 20, 2021. Winners were announced during the digital ceremony on December 11, hosted by Larray from a party bus in Los Angeles. Winners of the categories were selected by an independent judging panel.

Winners are listed first, in bold.

OVERALL
Show of the Year	Creator of the Year
**30 Days With: Bretman Rock (by Bretman Rock)**; Binging With Babish (by Babish Culinary Universe); Captain Disillusion; Could You Survive The Movies? (by Vsauce3); Dark History; Good Mythical Morning; Nikita Unfiltered (by Nikita Dragun); Ryan's World; UNHhhh (by WOWPresents); Verzuz	**MrBeast**; Addison Rae; Alexa Rivera; Avani Gregg; Bella Poarch; Brent Rivera; Charli D'Amelio; Dixie D'Amelio; Dream; Emma Chamberlain
International	Short Form
**Mythpat**; Anasala | أنس و أصالة; Enaldinho; Mikecrack; Tokai On Air	**the cheeky boyos**; 8illy; Bella Poarch; Jake Fellman; Matt Taylor
INDIVIDUAL AWARDS
Breakout Creator
**Bella Poarch**; Karl Jacobs; Quenlin Blackwell; Stokes Twins; Tinx
Collaboration	Crossover
**Markiplier and CrankGameplays – Unus Annus**; Harry Mack and Marcus Veltri – Pianist & Freestyle Rapper BLOW MINDS on Omegle ft. Marcus Veltri; Ryan's World, NASA, and JAXA – Ryan Makes A Video Call With The Space Station; Zach Campbell and Lil Nas X – Lil Nas X "Montero (Call Me By Your Name)" REACTION WITH LIL NAS X!!; ZHC and MrBeast – I Surprised MrBeast With A Custom House!	**Will Smith – Will Smith (YouTube)**; Bill Gates – Bill Gates (YouTube); Hailey Rhode Bieber – Hailey Rhode Bieber (YouTube); Nick Jonas – @nickjonas (TikTok); Ryan Reynolds – Ryan Reynolds (YouTube)
First Person	Livestreamer
**Yes Theory**; Airrack; Emma Chamberlain; LARRAY; Nicole Tv	**Valkyrae**; auronplay; GeorgeNotFound; NICKMERCS; shroud
SHOW AWARDS
Indie Series	Live Show
**Chicken Shop Date (by Amelia Dimoldenberg)**; The Blues (by DeStorm Power); I spent a day with (by Anthony Padilla); Pls, Disinfect: The Visual EP (by Tré Melvin); Sidetalk NYC	**Verzuz**; #FAZE5 Challenge (by FaZe Clan); $300,000 Influencer Trivia Tournament! (by MrBeast); David Blaine Ascension (by David Blaine); Omegle Bars (by Harry Mack)
Scripted Series	Unscripted Series
**Could You Survive The Movies? (by Vsauce3)**; The Confession Game (by DeStorm Power); Mortal Glitch (by enchufetv); True Facts (by zefrank1); Two Sides: Unfaithful	**30 Days With: Bretman Rock (by Bretman Rock)**; Good Mythical Morning; Nikita Unfiltered (by Nikita Dragun); Odd One Out (by Jubilee); UNHhhh (by WOWPresents)
Podcast	
**Dark History**; Anything Goes with Emma Chamberlain; Call Her Daddy; Impaulsive; On Purpose With Jay Shetty	
SUBJECT AWARDS
Animated	Beauty
**Ketnipz**; Haminations; Jaiden Animations; The Land of Boggs; TootyMcNooty	**Bailey Sarian**; Brad Mondo; Hyram; MissDarcei; NikkieTutorials
Comedy	Commentary
**LeendaDong**; CalebCity; Gus Johnson; Jack Pop; Please Don't Destroy	**Drew Gooden**; ContraPoints; Danny Gonzalez; Jarvis Johnson; Lindsay Ellis
Dance	Documentary
**JABBAWOCKEEZ**; Aust & Mar; Kelli Erdmann; Kyle Hanagami; Matt Steffanina	**DON'T TRY THIS AT HOME (by Jeff Wittek)**; Brut. Docs; DIGGING A SECRET TUNNEL (by Colin Furze); EvanMCGaming; Life in a Day 2020
Fashion and Style	Food
**Wisdom Kaye**; Chriselle Lim; Gunnar Deatherage; HauteLeMode; Loïc Prigent	**Nick DiGiovanni**; Alexis Nikole Nelson; Babish Culinary Universe; Cooking With Lynja; Joshua Weissman
Gaming	Health and Wellness
**Dream**; Aphmau; Markiplier; MrBeast Gaming; PrestonPlayz	**Doctor Mike**; Austen Alexander; Chloe Ting; Linda Sun; Yoga With Adriene
Kids and Family	Learning and Education
**The LaBrant Fam**; Ninja Kidz TV; Ryan's World; The Shluv Family; Team2Moms	**Veritasium**; Captain Disillusion; Map Men; onlyjayus; Tom Scott
Lifestyle	News
**Addison Rae**; Alexa Rivera; AMP; Avani Gregg; Brent Rivera	**Channel 5 with Andrew Callaghan**; Brian Tyler Cohen; HasanAbi; The Philip DeFranco Show; TheSyncUp
Science and Engineering	Sports
**Mark Rober**; Simone Giertz; Stuff Made Here; Unnecessary Inventions; William Osman	**Deestroying**; Jomboy; Nick Pro; Sky & Ocean; Sunisa Lee
Technology	
**Mrwhosetheboss**; iJustine; Linus Tech Tips; Marques Brownlee; Supercar Blondie	
CRAFT AWARDS
Cinematography	Editing
**Jonna Jinton – Jonna Jinton**; Alan Walker – Kristian Berg and Gunnar Greve; Becki and Chris – Becki Peckham and Chris Nicholas; Crow's Eye Productions – Nicole Loven; devinsupertramp – Devin Graham	**Cooking With Lynja – Lynn Davis**; Brandon Rogers – Brandon Rogers; emma chamberlain – Emma Chamberlain; Logan Paul – Hayden Hillier-Smith; Van Neistat – Van Neistat
Visual and Special Effects	Writing
**Zach King – Zach King**; AaronsAnimals – Aaron Benitez; Buttered Side Down – Buttered Side Down; Corridor Digital – Wren Weichman, Niko Pueringer, Sam Gorski; Rudy Willingham – Rudy Willingham	**The Game Theorists – Matthew Patrick, Justin Kuiper**; Julie Nolke – Julie Nolke; The Korean Vegan – Joanne Lee Molinaro (이선영); RDCworld1 – RDCWorld; tom cardy – Tom Cardy

Creator Honor awards

- **Swoop** (presented by Bailey Sarian)
- **Amelie Zilber** (presented by Jay Shetty)
- **Remi Cruz** (presented by LaurDIY)
- **Jeremy Fielding** (presented by Mark Rober)

=== Brand Awards ===
BRAND AWARDS
Agency of the Year	Brand of the Year
**Portal A**; BEN Group; Reach Agency; Spacestation Integrations; XX Artists	**Target**; Disney Plus; Doritos; Mattel; Warner Bros.
Brand as Creator	Brand Engagement
**SpongeBob SquarePants**; Barbie; Netflix; Poo~Pourri; The Washington Post	**Fortnite – 100 Thieves Cash App Compound Fortnite Activation**; Bliss – #ClearGenius; The Conjuring – #ConjuringHorror; Current – I Got Hunted By A Real Bounty Hunter (by MrBeast); Hot Pockets – Pockets 4 Bits
Branded Series	Branded Video
**Let's Target Season 3 – Target**; Late Night Taste Buds – Doritos; Lyft Comics – Lyft and LOL Network; Smokey Wrote That – AARP; You Can Be Anything – Barbie	**Building A Laser Baby – Amazon Prime Video and Michael Reeves**; 100 People Call Someone to Say "I Love You." – Everyone and The Cut; CATch Me If You Can 3 – Energizer and AaronsAnimals; Discord – The Movie (2021) – Discord; Masters of the Universe: Revelation Dance Battle – Mattel and Netflix
Creator Product	Influencer Campaign
**Happy Dad Hard Seltzer – NELK**; CLOAK – Markiplier, Jacksepticeye, Pokimane; Holo Taco – Simply Nailogical; MrBeast Burger – MrBeast; Nebula	**Tide Super Bowl 2021 – Tide**; Disney x CASETiFY; Information Literacy – Google Search; UD x Prince – Urban Decay; Vlad wants to be strong like a WWE Superstar – Mattel, Vlad and Niki
Social Impact Campaign	
**Leftovers Roulette – Kroger Zero Hunger | Zero Waste Foundation, The Try Guys**; Extreme Barbie Makeover: Dream House Reveal! – Habitat for Humanity and Mr. Kate; Gaming to Fight Alzheimer's – HFC, FaZe Clan and Seth Rogen; Gaming While Black – Doritos’ SOLID BLACK Initiative; World Wish Day – Make-A-Wish	

=== Social Good Awards ===
Creator Award	**Emmanuel Acho – Uncomfortable Conversations with a Black Man**; **Jay Shetty and Radhi Devlukia-Shetty – Help India Breathe**; **Shirley Raines – Beauty2TheStreetz**
Company or Brand Award	**Activision – Call of Duty Endowment**; **P&G – Vital Voices, NowThis NEXT**; **State Farm – St. Jude Children's Research Hospital, The Game Theorists**
Nonprofit or NGO Award	**Food Pantry – Beast Philanthropy**; **Invisible People – Invisible Stories**; **NEXT for AUTISM – Color the Spectrum LIVE (Mark Rober and Jimmy Kimmel)**

== Reception ==
Paul Grein of Billboard said that the show had a "distinctly young vibe" and described Larray and Issa Twaimz as having an "easy rapport" while delivering awards from the Streamys bus. He felt that the return of the Creator Honor awards was the "show's smartest move" because it allowed for genuine moments between the creators presenting the awards and the honorees. International Creator of the Year winner Mythpat praised the Streamys' use of an independent judging panel rather than voting, saying "It is not always about the number of followers but about the quality and type of content. Even someone with 1,000 followers can create path-breaking content while someone with one million followers can create mediocre content. It is always the content that should be valued. I would like to see more award organisers practising this system of judging." The show had a 43% increase in YouTube viewership compared to 2020.
