= Chriselle =

Chriselle or Chrisell might refer to:

- Chriselle Almeida, Indian actress
- Chriselle Lim, American stylist and influencer
- Chrishell Stause, American television personality
