= Stokes Twins =

American-Chinese twin celebrities (born 1996)

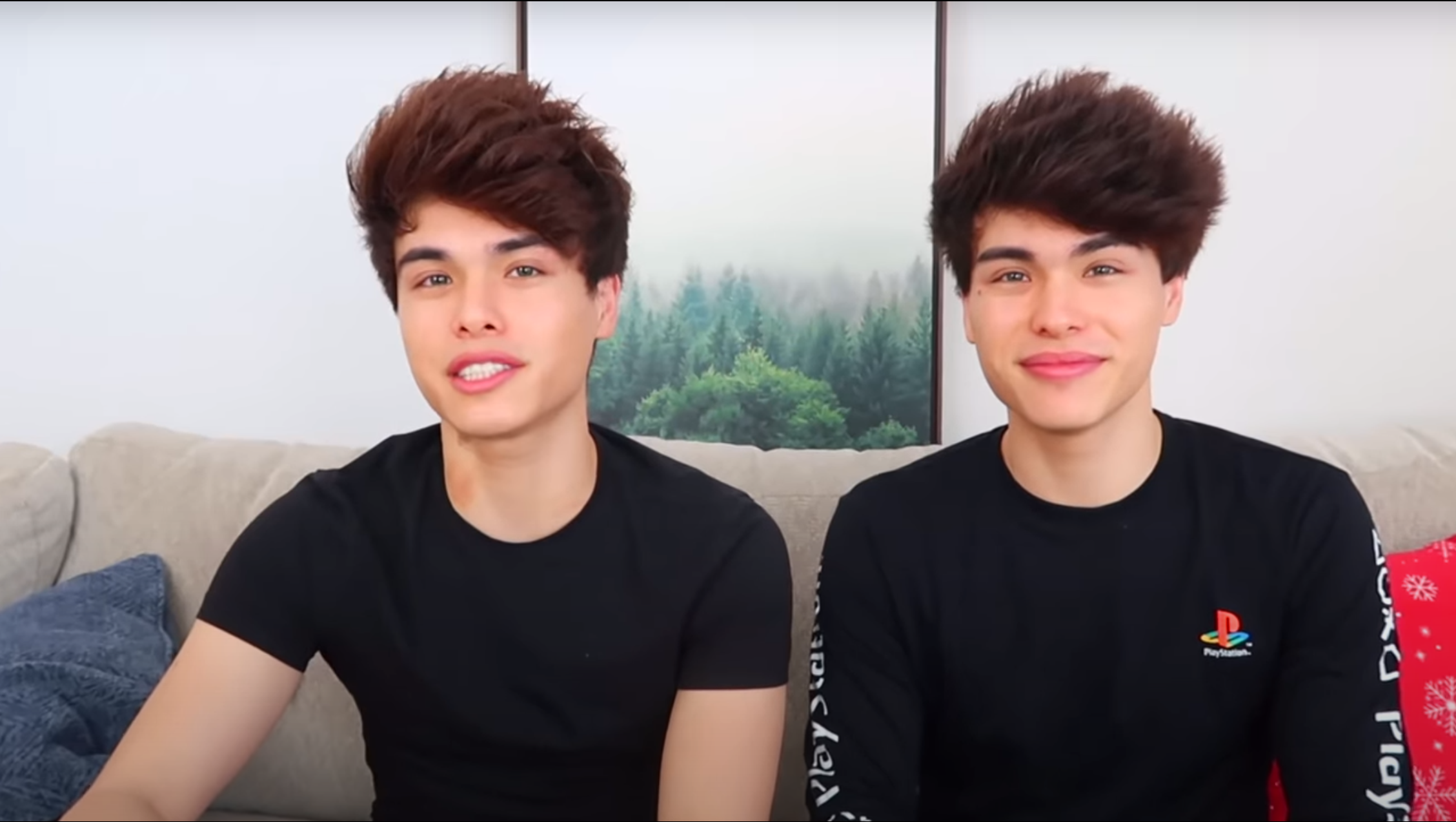
- Alan (left) and Alex Stokes (right) in 2021
- Born: Alan Chen Stokes; Alex Chen Stokes; November 23, 1996 (age 29); Shenyang, China
- Citizenship: United States; China
- Occupations: YouTubers; TikTokers; Influencers

Instagram information
- Followers: 4.9 million

TikTok information
- Followers: 30.9 million

YouTube information
- Channels: Stokes Twins; Stokes Twins Too; Stokes Twins Top Videos
- Years active: 2008–present
- Genres: Comedy; Shorts; Vlogs
- Subscribers: 144 million (main channel); 161 million (combined) (Note: Subscribers, broken down by channel: 144,000,000 (Stokes Twins) 13,200,000 (Stokes Twins Too) 3,450,000 (Stokes Twins Top Videos))
- Views: 32.333 billion (main channel); 41.385 billion (combined) (Note: Views, broken down by channel: 32,333,465,510 (Stokes Twins) 8,716,748,497 (Stokes Twins Too) 335,060,700 (Stokes Twins Top Videos))
- Last updated: August 9, 2026

Alan and Alex Chen Stokes (born November 23, 1996), commonly known as the Stokes Twins, are American twins and influencers known for their YouTube and TikTok accounts. They began making videos separately and then combined their following into a shared twins account.

The Stokes Twins were named in Forbes' 2024, 2025, and 2026 Top Creators lists, ranking #5, #19, and #18 in each year respectively. They were also named to the 2025 TIME100 Creators list, which profiles the 100 most influential figures on the internet.

== Early life and education ==
Alan and Alex were born in Shenyang and spent their childhood between Liaoning and Knoxville, Tennessee. They have described their maternal grandfather—who helped raise them during summers in China—as a major influence on their work ethic and philanthropic outlook. The brothers enrolled in pre-medical studies at a California community college but left in 2016 to pursue social media full-time. For roughly eighteen months they lived in their car, showered at public gyms, and uploaded 6-second sketches to Instagram before pivoting to YouTube.

== Career ==
The twins created their joint channel on March 11, 2017, and reached four million subscribers within two years by mixing prank skits with dance trends popular on Musical.ly. The pair also create on TikTok where they had 24 million followers as of 2020, where they do Q&A and prank style videos.

YouTube suspended monetisation for six months in 2021 following a prank that resulted in misdemeanor charges (see Legal issues). Footage of the prank resulting in demonetization does not appear on their channel. At the time of their misdemeanor charges the channel had about 4.8 million followers. After revenues were restored the twins began reinvesting "roughly US$10 million a year" in elaborate set builds, dubbing their videos into eight languages, and hiring VFX-specialist editors. A 2022 upload entitled "I Spent $1,000,000 in 24 Hours" surpassed 100 million views.

Multi-language dubbing along with a greater focus on YouTube Shorts led to a sharp spike in 2024: average daily views rose from 3–5 million to about 50 million, and the channel passed 100 million subscribers that November.

=== Content and style ===
Producer and photographer Jordan Matter calls the twins "masters of hybridising trends," noting their habit of combining two or more popular formats—such as hidden-room builds and large-scale hide-and-seek in a single video. Episodes are tightly storyboarded (scripts run 15–20 pages) and shot by a lean in-house crew plus freelance set builders.

=== Business ventures ===
Although outside sponsorship enquiries increased after 2024, the twins have accepted comparatively few brand deals, arguing that mid-roll advertisements can hurt viewer retention. Forbes reports that most of their income still comes from AdSense. In early 2025 they announced plans to launch a consumer product line aimed at teens; details have not yet been released.

=== Philanthropy and community work ===
Several videos incorporate charitable acts—such as funding year-long leases for homeless crew members and buying vehicles for friends—in addition to off-camera donations the twins say are made privately. They have appeared at Southern California food-bank drives and were among influencers promoting #TeamSeas in 2022. The Stokes Twins were also lead creators in supporting the #TeamWater initiative in 2025, which helped raise $40,000,000 for clean water for 2,000,000 people.

== Public image ==
=== Critical reception ===
Commentators praise the twins' production values and rapid global growth, while noting earlier criticism for thumbnail designs that closely resembled those of larger creators. In a 2025 interview the brothers said they now spend "at least six hours" sketching each thumbnail to ensure originality. In Forbes' 2024 Top Creators list, the twins ranked #5. In Forbes' 2025 Top Creators list, the Stokes Twins ranked #19, with the magazine estimating their 12-month earnings at roughly $20 million. In Forbes' 2026 Top Creators list, the twins ranked #18.

=== Legal issues ===
In October 2019, the twins filmed a prank in Irvine, California that onlookers mistook for a bank robbery. In the video the twins were dressed in black clothing with ski masks, carrying duffle bags filled with cash and pretended to rob a bank and then order an Uber to drive away. The brothers were issued a warning and released but repeated their behavior hours later on the University of California, Irvine campus prompting additional emergency response calls. In August 2020, they were charged with false imprisonment and reporting a false emergency. Both pleaded guilty to a misdemeanor. In April 2021, receiving 160 hours of community service and one year of probation. YouTube temporarily demonetized the channel but restored ads later that year.

== See also ==
- List of most-subscribed YouTube channels
- List of YouTubers
