= Mark Rober =

American YouTuber and engineer (born 1980 or 1981)

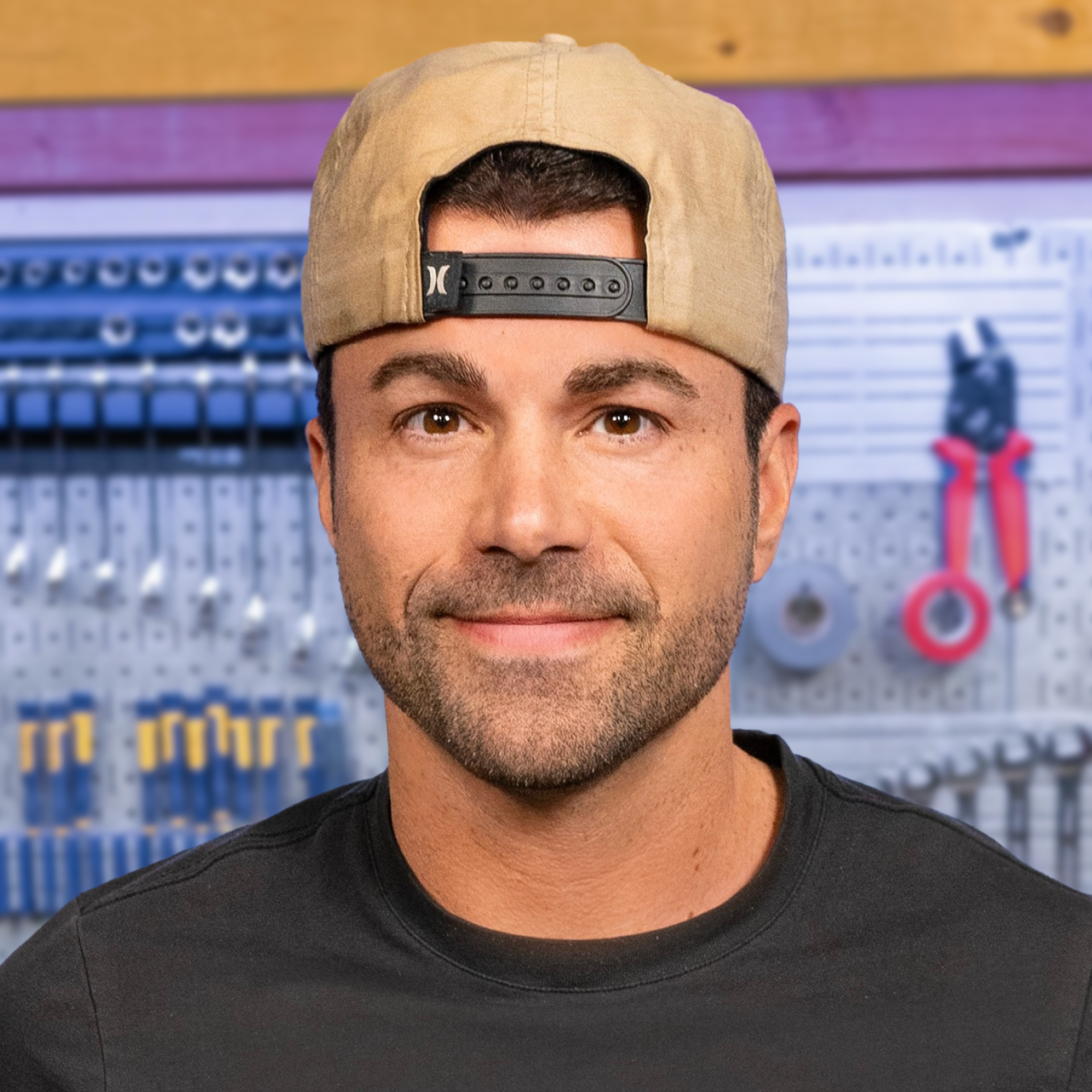
- Rober in 2025
- Born: Mark B. Rober; 1980 or 1981 (age 45–46); Orange County, California, U.S.
- Education: Brigham Young University (BS); University of Southern California (MS)
- Occupations: Engineer; inventor; YouTuber
- Known for: Social media videos; CrunchLabs; Curiosity
- Children: 1

YouTube information
- Channel: Mark Rober
- Years active: 2011–present
- Genres: Science & Technology
- Subscribers: 86.8 million
- Views: 20.4 billion
- Last updated: November 21, 2026

Mark B. Rober (born 1980 or 1981) is an American YouTuber, engineer, inventor, and educator. He is known for his YouTube videos on popular science and do-it-yourself gadgets. Before he became a YouTuber, Rober was an engineer with NASA for nine years, where he spent seven years working on the Curiosity rover at NASA's Jet Propulsion Laboratory. He later worked for four years at Apple as a product designer in their Special Projects Group, where he authored patents involving virtual reality in self-driving cars.

== Early life and education ==
Rober was raised in Brea, California, the youngest of three siblings. He graduated from Brea Olinda High School in 1998. He became interested in engineering at a young age, making a pair of goggles that helped avoid eye irritation while cutting onions. Rober graduated from Brigham Young University (BYU) in 2004 with a Bachelor of Science in mechanical engineering. He initiated into Tau Beta Pi (the National Engineering Honor Society) that same year. He later earned a Master of Science in mechanical engineering from the University of Southern California (USC) in 2014.

== Career ==
=== Early career ===
Rober joined NASA's Jet Propulsion Laboratory (JPL) in 2004. He worked there for nine years, seven of which were spent working on the Curiosity rover, which is now on Mars. He designed and delivered hardware on several JPL missions, including Advanced Modeling Technology (AMT), GRAIL, SMAP, and Mars Science Laboratory. While at NASA, Rober was one of the primary architects for "JPL Wired", which was a comprehensive knowledge capture wiki. He published a case study about applying wiki technology in a high-tech organization to develop an "Intrapedia" for the capture of corporate knowledge.

=== Science communication ===
While at NASA, Rober began making viral videos. His videos cover a wide variety of topics, sparking ideas for April Fools' Day pranks and teaching about beating an escape room and filming primates in zoos non-invasively. He also advocates for science in many of his videos.

In October 2011, Rober recorded his first YouTube video. It shows a Halloween costume that used two iPads to create the illusion of seeing through his body. His video of the "gaping hole in torso" costume went viral, receiving 1.5 million views in one day. The following year, Rober launched Digital Dudz, an online Halloween costume company that specializes in Halloween costumes based on the same concept as the video (to which Rober holds the patent). The company took in $250,000 in revenue in its first three weeks of operations, and by 2013 his app-integrated costumes were sold in retail stores such as Party City. The costumes were widely featured on news channels such as CBS News, CNN, The Tonight Show with Jay Leno, Fox, Yahoo! News, the Discovery Channel, The Today Show and GMA. He sold the company to UK-based costume company Morphsuits in 2013.

Demonstration of Mark Rober's glitter bomb

In December 2018, Rober posted a video showing how he tricked parcel thieves with an engineered contraption that sprayed glitter on the thieves, emitted a foul odor via fart spray, and captured video of the thieves. The video went viral, receiving 25 million views in one day. Rober later removed two of the five incidents caught on tape after discovering that two of the thieves were actually friends of a person he hired to help catch the package thieves. Rober posted a follow-up in December 2019, teaming up with Macaulay Culkin and featuring an improved design. Rober would post another follow up a year later with a third edition of the bomb. While designing it, Rober collaborated with Jim Browning, Scammer Payback, and various state and federal authorities to use the glitter-bomb bait package as a tactic to track and arrest money mules and their supervisors, who were working with scamming call centers in India to rob elderly people of thousands of dollars. This was in conjunction with a multi-YouTuber movement to get back at and shut down scam callers, while raising awareness to prevent other people from being scammed. The videos resulted in the shutdown of these call centers and the arrest of 15 senior officials involved in the scams.

In 2020, Rober released the video Backyard Squirrel Maze, showing a backyard obstacle course he built to deter squirrels from stealing food from his bird feeders. He released a follow-up video of an updated obstacle course a year later. By September 2023, the original video had 114 million views; the second video, 80 million and the third, 25 million.

Rober has contributed articles to Men's Health, and gave a TEDx presentation in 2015 How to Come Up with Good Ideas and another one entitled The Super Mario Effect – Tricking Your Brain into Learning More. He has also made numerous appearances on Jimmy Kimmel Live!, including guest-hosting the show in July 2022.

In 2018, it was reported that Rober had been secretly working on virtual reality projects for Apple, including the company's on-board entertainment for self-driving cars, for which Rober wrote two virtual reality-related patents. Rober worked as a product designer in Apple's Special Projects Group from 2015 to early 2020. In 2020, Rober starred in a Discovery Channel hidden-camera show Revengineers alongside Jimmy Kimmel. He also starred in the series This is Mark Rober on Discovery. Rober is also the host of a Netflix competition which began in 2026. The show is produced by Jimmy Kimmel and CrunchLabs.

=== CrunchLabs ===
Rober is the founder of CrunchLabs, an educational technology company he launched in 2022. The company creates hands-on STEM learning experiences and subscription box services (known as CrunchLabs Build Boxes) that contain building projects and engineering challenges for children.

== Philanthropy ==
In October 2019, MrBeast and Rober released a project labeled #TeamTrees, after a tweet that suggested that MrBeast should plant 20 million trees. MrBeast and Rober worked with YouTubers across the globe in an effort to make this come true. The goal was to raise $20,000,000 for the Arbor Day Foundation by 2020, while the Arbor Day Foundation would plant one tree for each dollar raised.

On October 29, 2021, Rober and MrBeast created #TeamSeas, another fundraiser which had a goal of $30 million. The money went to The Ocean Cleanup and the Ocean Conservancy, two not-for-profit organizations. They planned to use this money to remove 30 million pounds of debris and trash from the ocean.

Rober and MrBeast launched Team Water in 2025. The project is a collaborative fundraiser that is a follow-up to the Team Trees and Team Seas campaigns. By August 2025, over $40 million was raised for WaterAid.

Rober created an educational initiative called Class CrunchLabs which provides $60 million of free STEM educational lessons, experiments, and teach training at no cost to schools. He announced the initiative during a TED talk in 2026.

== Personal life ==
Rober moved to Sunnyvale, California, in 2015. Rober is an advocate for autism awareness, as his son has autism. In April 2021, Rober and Jimmy Kimmel hosted a live stream, raising $3 million in support of NEXT for AUTISM.

Rober was previously married, until his divorce in 2021.

== Awards and nominations ==
In 2021, the Institution of Engineering and Technology awarded Rober a one-off prize as STEM Personality of the Year and later named him an Honorary Fellow in recognition of his contribution to the engineering profession.

Rober also delivered the 2023 commencement address at Massachusetts Institute of Technology.

In 2024, Rober was presented with the FIRST Robotics Competition Founder's Award at the FIRST Championship in recognition of his efforts to expand access to STEM education and robotics programs.

Year	Award	Category	Nominee	Result	Ref.
2018	8th Streamy Awards	Science or Education	Mark Rober	Nominated	
2019	9th Streamy Awards	Science or Education	Mark Rober	Won	
2020	10th Streamy Awards	Learning and Education	Mark Rober	Won	
2020	10th Streamy Awards	Nonprofit or NGO	Team Trees (Mark Rober and MrBeast)	Won	
2021	11th Streamy Awards	Science and Engineering	Mark Rober	Won	
2021	11th Streamy Awards	Nonprofit or NGO	NEXT for AUTISM's Color the Spectrum LIVE (Note: Live stream hosted by Rober and Jimmy Kimmel) (Mark Rober and Jimmy Kimmel)	Won	
2022	26th Webby Awards	Webby Film & Video Person of the Year	Mark Rober	Won	
2022	12th Streamy Awards	Creator of the Year	Mark Rober	Nominated	
2022	12th Streamy Awards	Science and Engineering	Mark Rober	Won	
2022	12th Streamy Awards	Collaboration	Mark Rober, Jim Browning, and Trilogy Media (Note: Video entitled "Pranks Destroy Scam Callers - GlitterBomb Payback")	Won	
2022	12th Streamy Awards	Social Good: Creator	Team Seas (Mark Rober and MrBeast)	Won	
2022	12th Streamy Awards	Brand Engagement	Team Seas (Mark Rober and MrBeast)	Won	
2022	12th Streamy Awards	Social Impact Campaign	Team Seas (Mark Rober and MrBeast)	Nominated	
2023	13th Streamy Awards	Science and Engineering	Mark Rober	Nominated	
2023	13th Streamy Awards	Creator Product	CrunchLabs	Nominated	
