= Miss Darcy =

Miss Darcy may refer to:

- Georgiana Darcy, fictional character in Pride and Prejudice by Jane Austen
- Mr. Darcy's Daughters, 2003 novel by Elizabeth Aston
- The Revelations of Miss Darcy, Victorian pornography

== See also ==
- MissDarcei (born 1991), Canadian beauty YouTuber
