= Sean Davis (soccer, born 1993) =

American soccer player

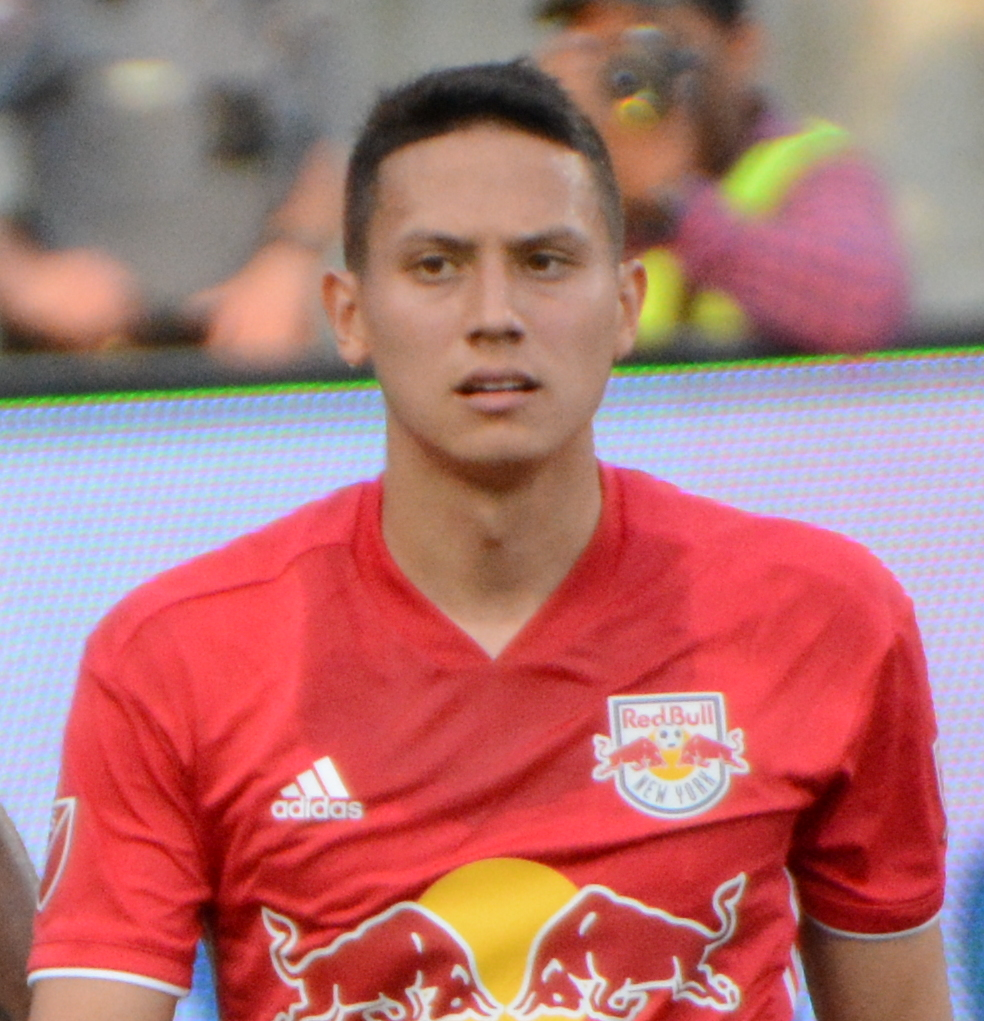
- Davis with the New York Red Bulls in 2019

Personal information
- Full name: Sean Akira Davis
- Date of birth: February 8, 1993 (age 33)
- Place of birth: Long Branch, New Jersey, United States
- Height: 6 ft 0 in (1.83 m)
- Position: Midfielder

Youth career
- 2008–2009: Match Fit Academy
- 2009–2011: New York Red Bulls

College career
Years	Team	Apps	(Gls)
2011–2014	Duke Blue Devils	65	(8)

Senior career*
Years	Team	Apps	(Gls)
2013	Carolina Dynamo	9	(2)
2014	New York Red Bulls U-23	11	(3)
2015–2016	New York Red Bulls II	10	(1)
2015–2021	New York Red Bulls	172	(4)
2022–2024	Nashville SC	91	(1)
2025	LA Galaxy	0	(0)

International career^{‡}
2008–2009	United States U17	8	(0)
2010	United States U18	3	(0)
- * Club domestic league appearances and goals as of October 23, 2024 ‡ National team caps and goals as of April 4, 2015

Sean Akira Davis (born February 8, 1993) is an American professional soccer player.

== Early life ==
Born in Long Branch, New Jersey, Davis grew up in Holmdel Township with his parents Lynn Yamada Davis, who would later become a celebrity chef on TikTok and YouTube, and Keith Davis.

=== Youth ===
Davis was a member of several youth clubs growing up, including the Holmdel Bulldogs, the NJSA 04 Academy, the Match Fit Academy, and the New York Red Bulls academics program.

== Early career ==
=== College ===
Davis was a two-time captain at Duke University, where he made a total of 65 appearances for the Blue Devils. He led the Atlantic Coast Conference in assists his senior year. Davis was a three-time All-ACC selection, a three-time member of the All-ACC Academic Team, the 2014 ACC Midfielder of the Year, a CoSIDA Academic All-America First Team selection, and a Lowe's Senior Class First Team honoree.

He also played in the Premier Development League for Carolina Dynamo in 2013. During the 2014 summer season, Davis played for the New York Red Bulls U-23 in the National Premier Soccer League. He helped the team capture the 2014 NPSL title appearing as a starter in the league final, where he registered the game winning assist.

== Club career ==
=== New York Red Bulls ===
On December 11, 2014, Davis signed a homegrown contract with the New York Red Bulls, making him the ninth homegrown signing in club history.

=== 2015 ===
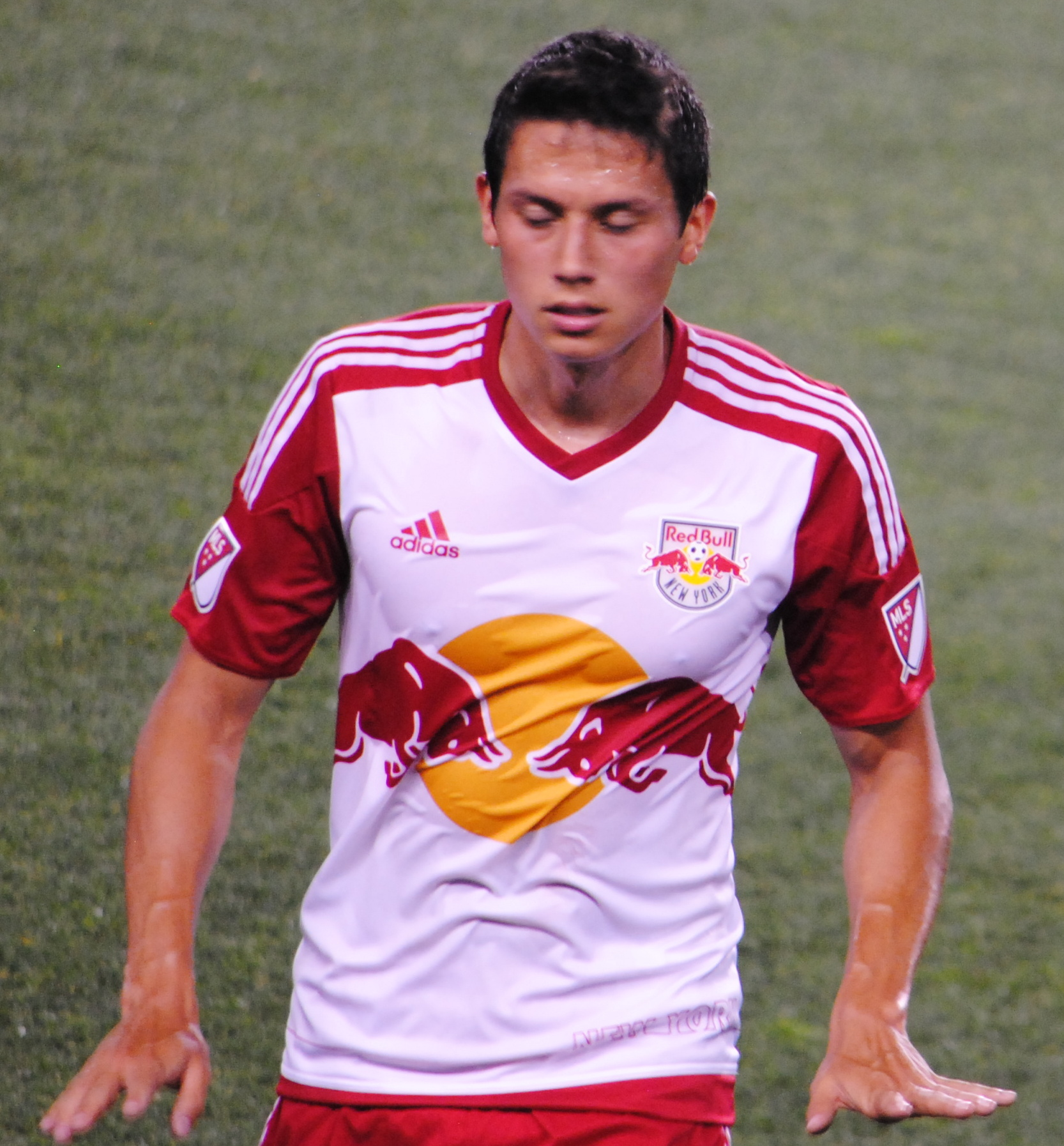
Sean Davis in 2015 playing for the New York Red Bulls

On April 4, 2015, he made his professional debut for USL affiliate club New York Red Bulls II, helping the team secure its first ever victory with a 4–1 win over Toronto FC II. Davis assisted the first ever goal scored for the New York Red Bulls II, with a cross to Anatole Abang.

On April 17, 2015, Davis made his MLS debut in a 2–0 victory over the San Jose Earthquakes, coming on as a substitute in the 86th minute for Sacha Kljestan. Shortly after his debut, Davis received his first start on May 2, 2015, in a 2–1 loss to the New England Revolution. Davis scored his first professional goal against the Atlanta Silverbacks in the U.S. Open Cup. He received Man of the Match honors for his efforts. On July 23, 2015, Davis led New York to a 4–2 victory over Premier League Champions Chelsea F.C. in a 2015 International Champions Cup match, scoring two goals in the victory. On July 28, 2015, Davis started and played 45 minutes in the 2015 Chipotle Homegrown Game at Dick's Sporting Goods Park. The team was coached by Landon Donovan. Davis' contributions off the bench during the 2015 season helped lead New York to their second Supporters' Shield in two years.

=== 2016 ===
On August 12, 2016, Davis scored his first MLS goal in a 2–2 draw against the LA Galaxy. A week later, on August 13, Davis scored his second goal of the season and assisted on two others in a 3–1 victory over Montreal Impact. Davis was later named to the MLS Team of the Week for his performance. In the league's annual 24 Under 24 series, Davis was ranked as the 22nd best player under the age of 24 in the league; drawing praise from pundits about his intelligence and ability to read the game.

Davis played every minute of the group stage as the New York Red Bulls qualified for the CONCACAF Champions League quarter finals for the first time in club history.

=== 2017 ===
On July 19, 2017, Davis opened the scoring for New York in a 5–1 victory over San Jose Earthquakes. On August 12, Davis recorded a goal and an assist in a 3–1 victory over Orlando City SC. In 2017, Davis appeared in a career high 30 MLS matches, including 23 starts.

=== 2018 ===
On March 1, 2018, Davis scored the second goal of the match for New York in a 2–0 victory over Olimpia in the CONCACAF Champions League. With the victory New York advanced to the Champions League Quarterfinals for the first time in club history.

On March 6, 2018, Davis started and played 90 minutes for New York in a 2–0 victory over Club Tijuana in the CONCACAF Champions League Quarter Finals. The New York Red Bulls made history that night, becoming the first Major League Soccer side to defeat a Liga MX team away in the knockout round of CONCACAF Champions League.

=== 2019 ===
On February 27, 2019, Davis scored his first goal of the season in 3–0 victory over Atlético Pantoja in the 2019 CONCACAF Champions League.

=== 2020 ===
On February 27, 2020, Davis was named captain of the club, the first homegrown player to do so. On August 20, Davis recorded his 100th MLS regular season start in a 1–0 win against NYCFC. He became the club's first homegrown player to ever reach this milestone.

=== 2021 ===
On October 2, 2021, Davis made his 200th appearance for the New York Red Bulls. He was only the third player in club history to reach this milestone, and the first ever homegrown player. By season's end, he also became the first midfielder in franchise history to play every minute of an MLS regular season. Davis led the team to their second straight playoff since becoming captain in the season prior.

=== Nashville SC ===
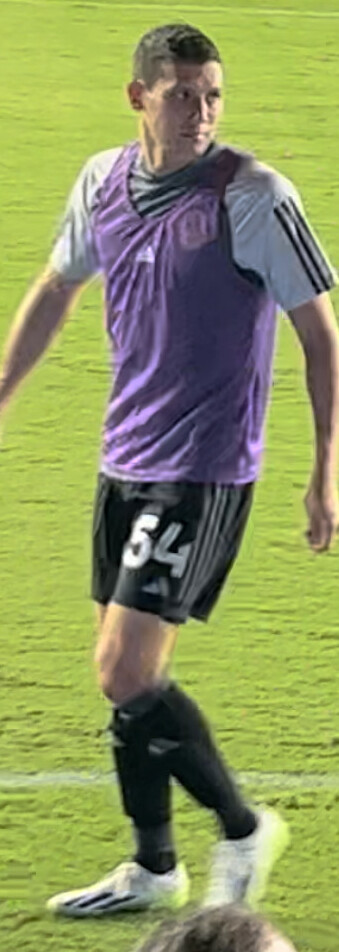
Sean warming up as a sub for Nashville SC in 2023

On January 4, 2022, Davis signed with Nashville SC on a three-year deal as a free agent.

=== LA Galaxy ===
On December 19, 2024, Davis was traded to LA Galaxy in exchange for Gastón Brugman. Davis was waived by LA Galaxy on February 19, 2025, just before the start of the 2025 season.

== International career ==
Davis was a member of the U.S. under-17 residency program from 2008 to 2009.

== Career statistics ==
As of November 19, 2021

Appearances and goals by club, season and competition
Club	Season	League		Playoffs		National cup		Continental		Total	
Club	Season	Apps	Goals	Apps	Goals	Apps	Goals	Apps	Goals	Apps	Goals
New York Red Bulls	2015	14	0	0	0	2	1	0	0	16	1
New York Red Bulls	2016	21	2	0	0	2	0	4	0	27	2
New York Red Bulls	2017	27	2	3	0	5	0	2	0	37	2
New York Red Bulls	2018	32	0	4	0	1	0	5	1	42	1
New York Red Bulls	2019	30	0	1	0	1	0	4	1	36	1
New York Red Bulls	2020	14	0	1	0	0	0	0	0	15	0
New York Red Bulls	2021	34	0	0	0	0	0	0	0	34	0
New York Red Bulls	Total	172	4	9	0	11	1	15	2	207	7
New York Red Bulls II (loan)	2015	5	0	1	0	0	0	0	0	6	0
New York Red Bulls II (loan)	2016	5	1	0	0	0	0	0	0	5	1
New York Red Bulls II (loan)	Total	10	1	1	0	0	0	0	0	11	1
Career total		182	5	10	0	11	1	15	2	218	8

== Honors ==
New York Red Bulls

- MLS Supporters' Shield: 2015, 2018

New York Red Bulls II

- USL Cup: 2016
