= Lynja =

American online celebrity chef (1956–2024)

- Lynja in 2021
- Born: Lynn Yamada; July 31, 1956; New York City, U.S.
- Died: January 1, 2024 (aged 67); Red Bank, New Jersey, U.S.
- Occupations: Chef; engineer
- Children: 4, including Sean

YouTube information
- Channel: Cooking With Lynja
- Years active: 2016–2024
- Genres: Comedy; entertainment; vlogs; reaction; cooking
- Subscribers: 15.2 million
- Views: 6.05 billion
- Last updated: September 8, 2026

Lynn Yamada Davis (née Yamada; July 31, 1956 – January 1, 2024), mononymously better known by her online alias Lynja, was an American online celebrity chef known for her viral TikTok and YouTube Shorts videos from 2020 until her death in 2024. Praised for her quick-styled editing and references to popular internet memes, "Cooking with Lynja" accumulated over 13.9 million subscribers on YouTube and over 22 million followers on TikTok as of February 2025.

Lynja earned degrees from MIT and Columbia Business School. She worked at AT&T Labs for 29 years. She developed an interest in video-making in 2020, when she was 63. Since going viral, she won three Streamy Awards and built up a fanbase of dedicated viewers.

== Early life and career ==
Lynn Yamada was born in New York City, on July 31, 1956, to Mabel Fujisake and Tadao Yamada. She was a third-generation Japanese-American and grew up in Fort Lee, New Jersey; she represented Japan in all of her Guinness World Records attempts.

She attended the Massachusetts Institute of Technology (MIT), earning a degree in civil engineering in 1977. During her time at MIT, she was the chairwoman for The Tech student newspaper. Following her graduation, she was employed by the government and worked to ensure the accessibility of federal buildings. She went on to earn degrees in public health and business administration from Columbia Business School.

Davis worked at AT&T Labs (then Bell Labs) for 29 years as a project manager and systems engineer.

== Online career ==
Davis began creating videos for TikTok in 2020 when she was 63. The idea for the videos came from her youngest son, Tim Davis, who was honing his video editing skills, while they were in lockdown during the COVID-19 pandemic in March 2020. He helped shoot and edit each of her "Cooking with Lynja" videos since 2020. The videos were praised by Vice for their simple recipes, clever editing techniques and writing style. The videos also reference viral memes, including the Grimace Shake trend. In 2021, "Cooking with Lynja" won "Best Editing" at the 11th Streamy Awards. The next year, "Cooking with Lynja" won "Best Food" and "Best Editing" at the 12th Streamy Awards. In 2022, Davis signed with WME and was featured on Forbes Top 50 creators list.

She frequently collaborated with fellow internet celebrity chef Nick DiGiovanni, including a video in November 2021 where they broke the Guinness World Record for the largest ever cake pop, which weighed 97 pounds 8.52 ounces (44.240 kg). She broke several other records with DiGiovanni, including the world's largest chicken nugget, which weighed 20.96 kg (46.2 lb) and the world's largest sushi roll, which measured at 2.15 metres (7 ft 1 in) in diameter. She was named to Forbes "50 Over 50" list in 2023. Her fans are called "Lynja-turtles", a play on words to the Ninja Turtles.

== Personal life ==
Davis lived in Holmdel Township, New Jersey. Davis married Hank Steinberg, having two daughters together, though the marriage ended in divorce. Following their divorce, she married Keith Davis with whom she had two sons, professional soccer player Sean Davis and "Cooking with Lynja" editor Tim Davis.

== Illness and death ==
In 2019, Davis was diagnosed with throat cancer, which caused her voice to change. Davis likened her new voice to Marge Simpson from The Simpsons. In 2021, she announced that she was diagnosed with esophageal cancer. Subsequently, she made a video called "Cookies for Cancer" in which she made cookies in celebration of finishing her cancer treatment. The cancer returned in 2023 and she died from complications of the disease at Riverview Medical Center in Red Bank, New Jersey, on January 1, 2024, aged 67. A private funeral, attended by close friends and family members, was held on January 9, three days before her death was announced on social media by her son in a post in which he shared photos and memories of her life. Later that day, fellow celebrity chef Nick DiGiovanni made a farewell video honoring Lynja by showcasing his favorite memories being with her.

== Awards and nominations ==
Year	Ceremony	Category	Result	Ref.
2021	11th Streamy Awards	Editing	Won	
2021	11th Streamy Awards	Food	Nominated	
2022	12th Streamy Awards	Editing	Won	
2022	12th Streamy Awards	Food	Won	
2023	13th Streamy Awards	Editing	Nominated	
2023	13th Streamy Awards	Food	Nominated	
