= Aphmau =

American YouTuber (born 1989)

- Born: Jessica Bravura; October 16, 1989 (age 37); Houston, Texas, United States
- Occupation: YouTuber
- Years active: 2012–present

Instagram information
- Page: Aphmau_

TikTok information
- Page: @aphmauwu

YouTube information
- Channel: Aphmau
- Years active: 2012-present
- Genre: Gaming
- Subscribers: 25.3 million
- Views: 30.6 billion
- Last updated: October 30, 2026

Jessica Bravura (born October 16, 1989), known online as Aphmau, is an American YouTuber mainly known for her content related to Minecraft (2011). She primarily publishes family-friendly role-playing and story-telling content, with some of her videos being part of long-running series. As of 2026, she is one of the most popular Minecraft YouTubers, with over 25.3 million subscribers and 30.6 billion views.

== Career ==
Bravura started creating Minecraft content for YouTube in 2012. She primarily publishes family-friendly role-playing and story-telling content, with her videos varying in style; some of her videos are part of long-running series. She also uploads Roblox gameplay videos. Bravura's popularity on YouTube initially started slow, though began to substantially increase starting around 2020 and 2021. In July of that year, Bravura appeared on Tubefilter's weekly top creators chart for the first time, with an estimated 61.8 million views that week. When she appeared on the chart again in March 2021, her weekly views were 131.2 million.

In July 2019, Bravura created a production company for her videos, Catface, which is based in Austin, Texas. The company also manages Bravura's merchandise line, MeeMeows, which manufactures plush toys of cats as well as clothing and accessories.

In June 2021, Bravura signed a deal with talent-management company Night, who at the time also represented popular creators like MrBeast and Matt Stonie. At the time, it was estimated Bravura's channel was receiving over 500 million views per month. In December of that year when Minecraft-related content on YouTube reached over one trillion total views, it was reported that Bravura's content made up more views than any other Minecraft YouTuber. At the time, her Minecraft videos had over 3.17 billion views combined. She has been noted as an example of Minecraft being particularly welcoming for female content creators on YouTube. By July 2024, Bravura's channel had over 21 million subscribers, becoming one of the most popular Minecraft content creators.

== Personal life ==
Bravura was born on October 16, 1989, in Houston. She and her husband, Jason, are parents to four children.

== Filmography ==
Year	Title	Role	Ref.
2025	A Minecraft Movie	Herself (cameo appearance)	

== Accolades ==
Award	Year	Category	Nominated work	Result	Ref.
Streamy Awards	2021	Gaming	Her YouTube channel	Nominated	
Streamy Awards	2022	Gamer	Her YouTube channel	Nominated	
Streamy Awards	2023	Gamer	Her YouTube channel	Nominated	
Nickelodeon Kids' Choice Awards	2024	Favourite Gamer	Her YouTube channel	Nominated	
