= Wisdom Kaye =

Nigerian-American model and influencer (2001)

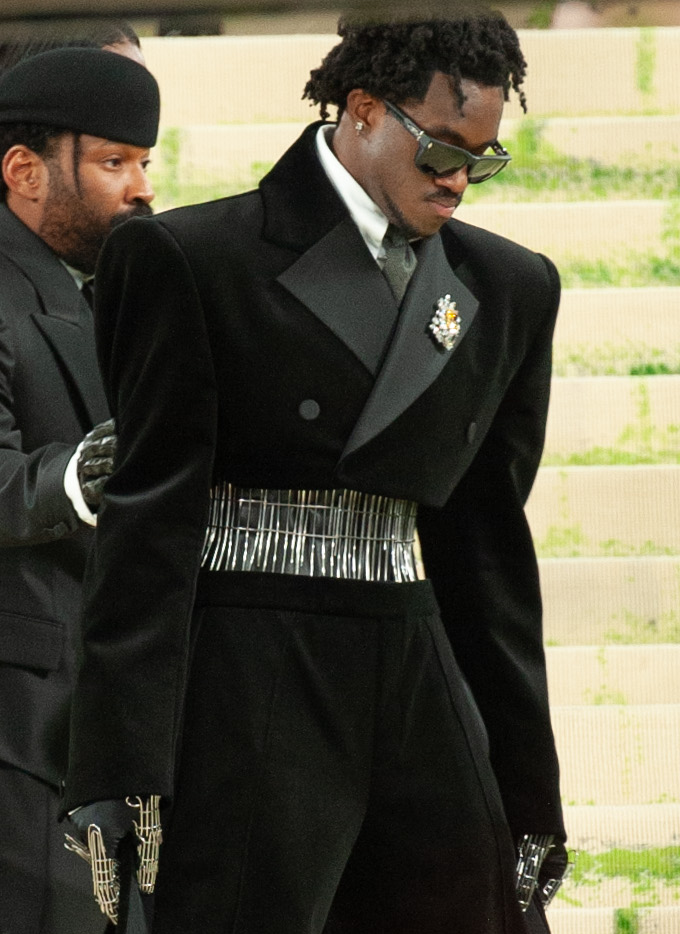
- Kaye at the 2026 Met Gala
- Born: Wisdom Uduebor; April 4, 2001 (age 25); Lagos, Nigeria
- Occupations: Model; influencer
- Years active: 2020–present
- Modeling information
- Height: 1.93 m (6 ft 4 in)
- Agencies: IMG Models (New York, Los Angeles, London, Paris, Milan)

TikTok information
- Page: Wisdom Kaye
- Followers: 14.2 million
- Last updated: March 12, 2026

Wisdom Kaye (né Uduebor) (born April 4, 2001) is a Nigerian-American model and social media influencer known for his fashion-related content. Vogue has described him as "TikTok's best-dressed guy".

== Early life ==
Wisdom Uduebor was born in Nigeria and moved to Houston, Texas, when he was four years old. He became interested in fashion in high school and was influenced by French fashion designer Hedi Slimane, who at the time was creative director of Yves Saint Laurent. Uduebor attended Fulshear High School and later enrolled at Texas State University to study mechanical engineering before dropping out.

== Career ==
Kaye was scouted by IMG Models through their social media team and made his runway debut at Balmain Spring/Summer 2022 fashion show. He has also worked with Dior, Fendi, Ralph Lauren, Coach New York, and Revlon.

Kaye joined TikTok in January 2020 and went viral for his take on the "Vogue Challenge"; by July 2020, he had reached 2 million followers. He also went viral for styling high-fashion outfits based on Marvel Cinematic Universe characters. In December 2021, he was featured on Teen Vogue's 21 Under 21 list. In 2023, he was featured in Forbes's 30 Under 30. In 2024, he attended the Met Gala, wearing Robert Wun.

In July 2025, Kaye was included in Time magazine's inaugural "TIME 100 Creators" list, in the "Leaders" category, recognizing his fashion-focused TikTok content and broader influence across social media. In January 2026, Kaye walked the runway for the Amiri Autumn-Winter 2026 show during Paris Fashion Week.

== Filmography ==
Year	Film	Role
2021	Project Runway	Guest judge
2021	Noah Beck Tries Things	Himself
2022	Making the Cut	Judge
2024	OMG Fashun	Judge

== Awards and nominations ==
Year	Award	Category	Result	Ref.
2020	Streamy Awards	Fashion and Style	Won	
2021	Streamy Awards	Fashion and Style	Won	
2022	Streamy Awards	Fashion and Style	Won	
2023	Streamy Awards	Fashion and Style	Won	
