= Zach Hsieh =

American YouTuber (born 1999)

ZHC
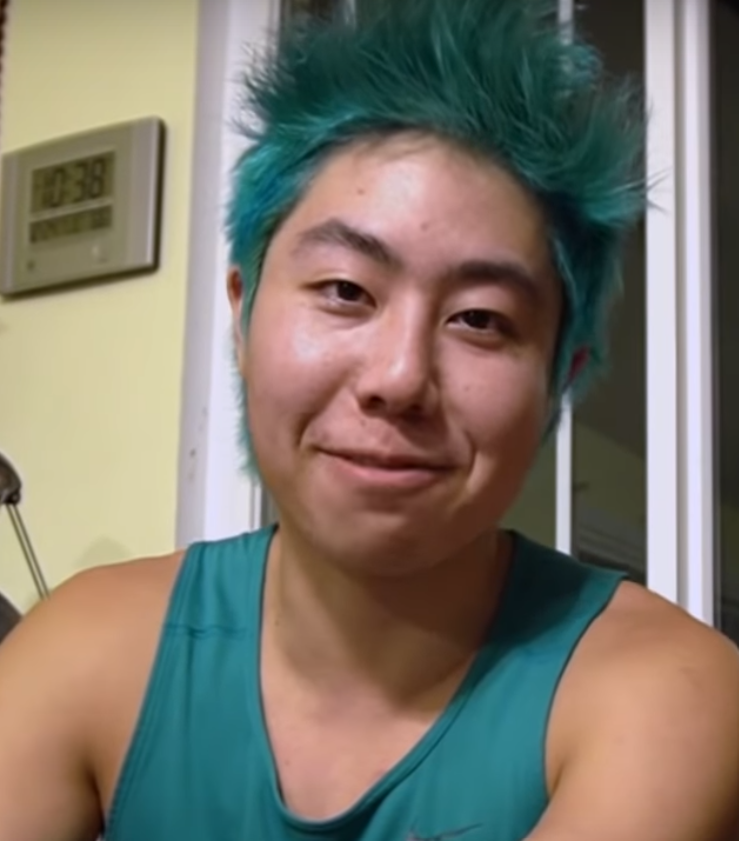
- Hsieh in 2019
- Born: Zachary Hsieh; January 14, 1999 (age 27); San Jose, California, U.S.
- Education: School of Visual Arts
- Spouse: Michelle Chin (m. 2025)

YouTube information
- Channel: ZHC
- Years active: 2013–present
- Genre: Art
- Subscribers: 29.3 million
- Views: 3.9 billion
- Last updated: October 21, 2025
- Website: zhcstore.com

Zachary Hsieh (born January 14, 1999), known online as ZHC, (Note: ZHC stands for Zach Hsieh Comic Art) is an American YouTuber. He is known for his drawing and custom art challenge videos.

Hsieh created his first YouTube channel in 2013 while studying at the School of Visual Arts in New York City. Initially uploading art tutorials, Hsieh expanded to his current format and reached one million subscribers in 2019, later reaching over 25 million subscribers.

== Early life and education ==
Hsieh was born in San Jose, California on January 14, 1999. Interested in art from an early age, he was inspired to practice comic book art by illustrated novels such as Captain Underpants, and wanted to be a Marvel Comics artist. At 16 years old, he committed to spending 12 hours a day or more practicing drawing. He went on to study at the School of Visual Arts in New York City. He began his YouTube channel in 2013, whilst he was a student at the school, and later dropped out to focus on practicing his art online.

== Internet career ==
When Hsieh began his YouTube channel, he created mainly tutorial videos, including tutorials on crosshatching and refilling Copic markers. His channel found viral success after the release of a 2018 "re-drawing" video in which he recreated hyperrealistic copies of a friend's drawings. Subsequently, his content evolved into competition based drawing videos and vlogs. He also expanded into MrBeast style videos and stunt-philanthropy, including giveaways, contests, and marathon livestreams. By early 2019, Hsieh had reached a million subscribers and had become able to support himself full-time through his YouTube videos. That February, his channel was noticed by fellow YouTubers MrBeast and PewDiePie after he released videos in which he drew massive superhero illustrations of them, and experienced a surge of rapid growth. He went on to make official collaboration videos with MrBeast (in which he customized products such as an iPhone and a Tesla car), as well as influencer Charli D'Amelio and DJ Steve Aoki. In April 2020, Hsieh was signed by creator management company Night Media. In September 2020, Hsieh launched the YouTube channel ZHC Shorts to release YouTube Shorts content on.

In February 2021, following grooming allegations against former host James Charles, it was announced that Hsieh would host the second season of the YouTube Originals show Instant Influencer. That March, Hsieh launched a collection of NFT art known as Critters By ZHC on the Nifty Gateway marketplace. The art features four characters that are also heavily featured in his content and merchandising: Bun Bun, Fayur, Turkey, and Scrunchie.

== Philanthropy ==
Hsieh's content has also expanded to incorporate philanthropy into his art videos by painting everyday objects for people. During the COVID-19 pandemic, Hsieh and his team of more than 24 artists painted classrooms at Strive Prep Montbello in Denver. He also painted murals at AdventHealth For Children in Orlando, Florida, and donated iPads and $240,000 to the hospital. In February 2021, Hsieh hosted a competition between himself and artists from his team to customize a 10-foot-tall PlayStation 5 for charity. As part of the video, over 24 PlayStation 5s were donated to Children in Need. Hsieh and his team hand-painted every home in the Arroyo Seco Tiny Home Village in Highland Park, Los Angeles, which was completed in October 2021. The village provides transitional housing for those experiencing homelessness in the community.

In April 2026, Hsieh painted a 40-foot dragon boat during the 26th annual Austin Dragon Boat Festival in Austin, Texas, which was donated to the Lunar Foundation.

== Personal life ==
Hsieh started dating Michelle Chin on August 17, 2018. Hsieh proposed to Chin on December 12, 2024. They got married on May 23, 2025. After having tried for a baby ever since the wedding, he announced that he’s becoming a father on June 5, 2026 and due to arrive on December 8. The gender has been announced through a TikTok video to be a boy. The couple lives in Austin, Texas.

== Awards and nominations ==
Year	Ceremony	Category	Nominee / work	Result	Ref.
2020	10th Streamy Awards	Breakout Creator	ZHC	Nominated	
2021	11th Streamy Awards	Best Collaboration	ZHC and MrBeast – I Surprised MrBeast With A Custom House!	Nominated	
