= Team Trees =

Fundraiser by MrBeast and Mark Rober

- Date: October 25, 2019 – present
- Also known as: TeamTree; #TeamTrees
- Cause: Deforestation
- Motive: To take action against deforestation by planting 20 million trees
- Target: To raise $20 million crowdfunded U.S. dollars
- Organized by: Jimmy Donaldson; Mark Rober
- Website: teamtrees.org

Team Trees (stylized as #TEAMTREES) is a collaborative fundraiser that raised 20 million U.S. dollars before the start of 2020 to plant 20 million trees. The initiative was started by American YouTubers MrBeast and Mark Rober, and was mostly supported by YouTubers. All donations go to the Arbor Day Foundation, a tree planting organization that pledges to plant one tree for every U.S. dollar donated. The Arbor Day Foundation began planting in January 2020 with plans to end "no later than December 2022". It is estimated that 23 million trees would take up 210 km^{2} (81 sq mi) of land, absorb around 1.6 million tons of carbon and remove 116 thousand tons of pollutants from the atmosphere.

As of September 5, 2026, the project has raised over 25,141,640, exceeding the fundraiser's goal to plant 20 million trees. As anticipated, more than 20 million trees have been planted.

== Background ==
The idea started on May 24, 2019, when a fan suggested on Reddit that MrBeast (Jimmy Donaldson) should plant 20 million trees to celebrate reaching 20 million subscribers on YouTube. The idea spread across YouTube, Reddit, and Twitter, mostly in the form of memes. The idea may have been related to the 2019 Amazon rainforest wildfires. American YouTuber, engineer, and inventor Mark Rober partnered directly with Donaldson to launch the fundraiser. On October 25, 2019, Donaldson uploaded a YouTube video explaining his plan, which claimed the top spot on YouTube's trending page, and caused numerous YouTubers to join the movement.

The trees will be planted "in a variety of forests on public and private lands in areas of great need" starting in January 2020. The goal is to have them planted "no later than December 2022".

== Efficacy ==
The Arbor Day Foundation has recorded and mapped every tree planted with the program. As of September 1, 2026, 25,122,450 trees have been planted across 30,475 acres at 104 projects worldwide.

== Responses ==
Many YouTubers created content to capitalize on the growing trend of Team Trees; despite the Arbor Day Foundation reaching out to only a few hundred creators, Team Trees is now featured in over 80,000 videos from over 4200 global creators. Across Instagram and Twitter over 556,001 posts have garnered more than 4.6 billion views.

Discovery Channel made a documentary called #TeamTrees about the campaign which aired on December 3, 2019, coupled with a donation of US$100,203 the next day.

Eike Lüdeling, the department head of horticultural sciences at the University of Bonn, stated, "It turns out that many of these seedlings, if you don't do this well or if people do it who don’t really care about those trees, then they all just die quickly. Sometimes it’s probably a better idea to plant fewer trees and really take care of them." Danny Cohn, the director of public relations for the Arbor Day Foundation, addressed these concerns, stating that "the partners who work with the organization are all required to have plans to help their trees thrive."

== Planting projects ==
Planting locations of Team Trees include:

Location	Country	Continent	Number of Trees	Status
Andes	Argentina, Bolivia, Chile, Ecuador, Peru	South America	300,000	Completed
Central and Northern Victoria	Australia	Oceania	75,000	Completed
Eastern Queensland	Australia	Oceania	300,000	Completed
Amazon rainforest	Brazil	South America	600,000	Completed
Atlantic Forest	Brazil	South America	170,000	Completed
	Burundi	Africa	100,000	Completed
Area of 2017 Elephant Hill Fire, British Columbia	Canada	North America	170,000	Completed
Area of 2017 Hanceville Fire, British Columbia	Canada	North America	150,000	Completed
The Great Green Wall	Chad, Mali, Senegal	Africa	3,840,000	Completed
Minqin County, Gansu Province	China	Asia	25,000	Completed
Gaizhou, Liaoning Province	China	Asia	45,000	Completed
	Dominican Republic	North America	200,000	Completed
	France	Europe	150,000	Completed
	Haiti	North America	1,050,000	Completed
Cauvery River Basin	India	Asia	905,439	Completed
West Papua Province	Indonesia	Asia	450,000	Completed
	Ireland	Europe	100,000	Completed
Kijabe Forest	Kenya	Africa	950,000	Completed
Xe Sap and Xe Pian National Protected Areas	Laos	Asia	30,000	
Kianjavato Mountain Range	Madagascar	Africa	400,000	Completed
	Madagascar	Africa	600,000	Completed
	Mozambique	Africa	1,252,007	Completed
Chitwan National Park	Nepal	Asia	885,000	Completed
Auckland	New Zealand	Oceania	28,789	Completed
Maitai valley	New Zealand	Oceania	32,590	Completed
	Nicaragua	North America	975,000	Completed
	Peru	South America	235,800	Completed
	Portugal	Europe	10,000	Completed
Freetown Peninsula	Sierra Leone	Africa	80,000	Completed
Palencia	Spain	Europe	4,200	Completed
Mae Hong Son province	Thailand	Asia	50,000	Completed
Adana Province	Turkey	Asia	60,000	Completed
İzmir Province	Turkey	Asia	50,000	Completed
	United Kingdom	Europe	24,000	Completed
	United Kingdom	Europe	50,000	Completed
Mersey Forest	United Kingdom	Europe	270,000	Completed
Southeastern United States	United States	North America	1,000,000	Completed
Mississippi River Valley in Arkansas, Louisiana, and Mississippi	United States	North America	1,000,000	
Butte County, California	United States	North America	100,000	Completed
Tyndall Air Force Base, Florida	United States	North America	983,000	Completed
Watersheds in Georgia	United States	North America	450,000	Completed
Michigan State Forests	United States	North America	2,207,067	Completed
Bitterroot National Forest, Montana	United States	North America	63,800	Completed
Flathead and Kootenai National Forests, Montana	United States	North America	281,132	Completed
Gallatin National Forest, Montana	United States	North America	275,000	Completed
Nebraska National Forest, Nebraska	United States	North America	40,000	Completed
Bladen Lakes State Forest, North Carolina	United States	North America	197,555	Completed
Rogue River-Siskiyou National Forest, Oregon	United States	North America	23,100	Completed
Willamette River Basin, Oregon	United States	North America	500,000	Completed
South Carolina	United States	North America	1,350,000	Completed
Rappahannock River Watershed, Virginia	United States	North America	50,000	Completed
Washington	United States	North America	650,000	Completed

== Team Seas ==
On October 29, 2021, MrBeast and Mark Rober teamed up again to launch Team Seas, a successor to the project that aimed to help clean up marine debris. As with the Team Trees campaign, many influencers had also joined in spreading the message to help the project be a success.

== See also ==
- Team Seas
- Team Water
- Billion Tree Tsunami
