= Bailey Sarian =

Makeup and true crime YouTuber (born 1988)

- Born: Bailey Brooke Sarian; November 26, 1988 (age 37); Los Angeles, California, U.S.
- Occupations: YouTuber; podcaster

Instagram information
- Page: baileysarian

YouTube information
- Channel: Bailey Sarian
- Years active: 2013–present
- Genres: Makeup; true crime
- Subscribers: 8 million
- Views: 1.5 billion
- Last updated: October, 2026

Bailey Brooke Sarian (born November 26, 1988) is a YouTuber known for her video series Murder, Mystery & Makeup and podcast Dark History. She is considered to have been the founder of the "true crime makeup" genre of YouTube videos.

== Career ==
Prior to creating her YouTube content, Sarian worked as a social media creator with cosmetics subscription service IPSY, and as an employee for the brands Sephora and Urban Decay. She began her YouTube channel in 2013 as a traditional makeup channel, producing makeup tutorials and reviews. In January 2019, she released the first episode of Murder, Mystery & Makeup, in which she discussed the Watts family murders whilst applying makeup. In 2020, fuelled by increased consumption of online content due to the COVID-19 pandemic, she went from 780,000 subscribers in March to 3.5 million by the end of the year. In June 2021, she debuted her AudioBoom original podcast Dark History with an episode on the DuPont chemical scandal. Video versions of the podcast filmed in Los Angeles are produced by Wheelhouse DNA and released on her YouTube channel the day following their AudioBoom release. She has also watched mystery movies while applying makeup for the official Netflix YouTube channel.

== Reception ==
In 2020, YouTube ranked Sarian amongst the top breakout creators of the year. She was also presented with a Creator Honor Award by NikkieTutorials at the 10th Streamy Awards, and was nominated for the Beauty subject award. At the 11th Streamy Awards, Sarian won the Beauty subject award. She was also nominated for Makeup Influencer of the Year at the 2021 USA Today American Influencer Awards.

In November 2021, The Guardian included Murder, Mystery & Makeup in a list of the best podcasts of the week, describing the series as reaching an "innovative new niche". It has also been listed as one of the best true crime podcasts on Spotify by The Scotsman. Dark History was listed as one of the best new podcasts of 2021 by publications such as the Las Vegas Weekly, Elle Australia, and Variety, and was the ninth top new show of the year on Apple Podcasts. It was also nominated for Show of the Year and won Podcast of the Year at the 11th Streamy Awards.

== Personal life ==
Sarian has Armenian ancestry.

As a child, Sarian had a speech impediment that made it difficult for her to pronounce the letter "R". With the help of a speech therapist, she largely overcame the issue, though she occasionally still struggles with words containing that sound.

Sarian currently lives in Los Angeles. Her mother was a 911 dispatcher who sometimes brought young Sarian with her to work, which piqued her interest in the true crime genre.

Sarian has been open about her mental health. She has attended therapy since the age of 18 and has stated that researching violent and distressing topics for her content has affected her wellbeing. Therapy has helped her establish boundaries around when she researches. Sarian also limits her screen time, spending about 45 minutes per day on social media, explaining that the constant flow of information and opinions can clutter her mind. She has said that this boundary has significantly improved her mental health and encouraged her to pursue other hobbies, including reading.
