= CrunchLabs =

Educational technology company

CrunchLabs LLC
- Founded: March 30, 2022; 4 years ago
- Founder: Mark Rober
- Headquarters: Sunnyvale, California, U.S.
- Key people: Jim E Lee (President, COO) Rachele Harmuth (CPO) Scott Lewers (CCO)
- Website: crunchlabs.com

CrunchLabs LLC is an educational technology company founded by American YouTuber and engineer Mark Rober in 2022. They primarily create subscription-based educational kits for children.

== History ==
CrunchLabs LLC was co-founded in 2022 by Mark Rober along with Jim E Lee as president and CEO, to create and sell STEM learning kits for kids.

In April 2024, CrunchLabs launched Hack Pack, a coding and robotics product for teens and adults.

In November 2024, CrunchLabs announced Space Selfie, a service in which a satellite will display a user-uploaded photo, and a photo of the satellite will be taken over a specified location and sent to the user. The service is free to CrunchLabs subscribers. The satellite was launched from the Vandenberg Space Force Base, California on a SpaceX Falcon 9 rocket on January 14, 2025.

CrunchLabs sponsored a leg of Chess.com's 2024 Champions Chess Tour. In 2025, it was announced that CrunchLabs would be launching in India. Also in May 2025, a global licensing deal between CrunchLabs and Australian-owned toy company Moose Toys was announced. The same year it hired former Lionsgate executive Scott Lewers as its chief content officer (CCO).

As of September 2025, CrunchLabs is set to produce a competition show for Netflix, along with Jimmy Kimmel, to be hosted by Rober in 2026.
