= Next for Autism =

Non-profit organization focusing on the needs of autistic people and their families

- Next for Autism
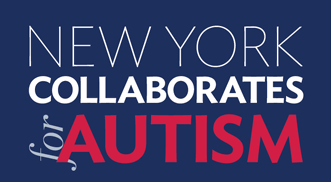
- Former logo
- Formation: August 30, 2002; 23 years ago
- Founder: Laura Slatkin; Harry Slatkin; Ilene Lainer
- Type: 501(c)(3) non-profit
- Headquarters: New York, New York, United States
- Website: https://www.nextforautism.org/

Next for Autism is an American non-profit organization founded in 2002 to address the needs of autistic people and their families. The organization was founded by Laura and Harry Slatkin and Ilene Lainer. One of Next for Autism's most well known accomplishments was opening the first charter school in New York to exclusively serve autistic students.

Every two years, Next for Autism partners with Comedy Central to produce an autism benefit called "Night of Too Many Stars". The event features performances from various comedians frequently including Jon Stewart, Conan O'Brien, Tina Fey, Amy Poehler, and George Clooney.

The organization also founded Project SEARCH Collaborates for Autism, a program to help autistic high school students transition from school to work. In June 2013, they opened the Center for Autism and the Developing Brain on the New York-Presbyterian Westchester campus to provide clinical services to autistic people throughout their lives.

Next for Autism provides grants to organizations to assist autistic people in the areas of employment opportunities, living environments, social engagement, healthcare and mental health support.

The organization began as the New York Center for Autism, then changed its name to New York Collaborates for Autism in 2012. It has since changed its name to Next for Autism.

In April 2021, Mark Rober and Jimmy Kimmel announced they would be hosting a live stream in support of Next for Autism. By May 1, they had raised over $3 million.

The organization and its leadership have been criticized by members of the autistic community, in part, for supporting the idea of curing or preventing autism, collaborating with Autism Speaks (a controversial autism-focused nonprofit) and endorsing applied behavior analysis (a controversial operant-conditioning system commonly marketed as a treatment for autism and widely rejected within the autistic rights movement). The New York charter school founded by Next for Autism bases its teaching methods on the principles of applied behavior analysis. As of 2025, four applied behavior analysis practitioners (Rebecca Turcios, Dawn Buffington Townsend, Mari Cerda and Nasiah Cirincione-Ulezi) sit on Next for Autism's advisory board. The organization characterizes criticism of applied behavior analysis as largely outdated; it also claims it rejects eugenics and does not support curing or preventing autism.
