= Team Water =

Drinking water fundraising group by MrBeast and Mark Rober

- Part of WaterAid
- Date: August 1, 2025 – present
- Type: Fundraiser
- Cause: Water scarcity
- Organized by: Jimmy Donaldson; Mark Rober
- Website: teamwater.org

Team Water (stylized as #TEAMWATER) is an international collaborative fundraiser that was started by YouTubers MrBeast and Mark Rober as a follow-up to Team Trees and Team Seas. The fundraiser raised over $40 million to provide clean drinking water to millions of people around the world. All of the donations from the fundraiser go to WaterAid, which is a non-governmental organization.

== History ==
=== Background ===
Following the success of their previous fundraisers, Team Trees and Team Seas—which raised over $50 million to plant 20 million trees and remove 30 million pounds of trash from the ocean—Jimmy "MrBeast" Donaldson and Mark Rober teamed up to launch Team Water.

=== Beginnings ===
The project was released on August 1, 2025. On YouTube, over 3000 creators created videos for the fundraiser.

=== Goal ===
Team Water aimed to provide millions of people with clean drinking water by raising $40 million by the end of August 2025, with 1 dollar providing clean water to one person for a year. They reached this initial goal, supplying 2 million people with clean water "for decades", on August 31, 2025.

== Donations ==
=== Total donations ===
As of April 7, 2026, over 41.785 million total years of water have been supplied, according to the Team Water website.

=== Notable donors ===
Several high-profile donors have contributed to the fundraiser, including:

Person	Donation	Notes
Kenneth C. Griffin	US$2.25 million	Donated following a public prompt from MrBeast during a live appearance on the Today show.
Sophie Rain	US$1 million	Donated during a livestream with MrBeast, placing her among the campaign’s top individual contributors.
Dana White	US$100,000	Donated after Adin Ross and MrBeast called and asked him to on a Kick livestream.
