= MissDarcei =

Canadian beauty YouTuber (born 1991)

- Born: Darcei Giles; November 12, 1991 (age 34); Toronto, Ontario
- Education: York University
- Years active: 2010–present

Instagram information
- Page: Darcei
- Followers: 1 million

TikTok information
- Page: Darcei
- Followers: 2.5 million

YouTube information
- Channel: MissDarcei
- Genre: Beauty
- Subscribers: 4.11 million
- Views: 2.36 billion
- Last updated: July 21, 2026

Darcei Giles (born November 12, 1991), also known as MissDarcei, is a Canadian beauty YouTuber and social media influencer. She uses her platform to advocate for inclusivity in the beauty industry, especially between the K-beauty community and Black women.

== Early life ==
Darcei Giles was born on November 12, 1991, in Toronto, Ontario and grew up as an only child in a single-parent household. As a child, she was into Korean culture; she was only into K-pop and Korean dramas. Giles was also a competitive dancer and was into theater. She attended York University. Before creating her channel, she worked part time at Sephora and Starbucks; her first job was at a movie theater.

== Career ==
Giles created her channel in 2010, originally just as a hobby to share her makeup hauls and hairstyles. She was not aware that it could become a job at the time. Her first viral video was in 2018, when she uploaded "Black Girl Tries Following A Korean Makeup Tutorial." She continued uploading video in the "Black Girl Tries" series, trying other makeup styles that are not commonly associated with Black women, which helped her launch YouTube as a career. In 2020, Giles quit her part-time job and became a full-time content creator, later gaining increased popularity in 2022 through YouTube Shorts. She had also created a TikTok account in 2020, during the COVID-19 pandemic. In 2022, Giles became the first Black creator to win the Streamy Award for Beauty.

In March 2024, Giles made a TikTok calling out K-beauty brand TirTir after she was gifted a foundation set at a store event. She liked the coverage and finish of the foundation, but the brand did not make a shade for her skin color. The video went viral and the brand later contacted her to partner with them on the launch of a new product that included twenty more shades, including her shade. In a year, TirTir went from nine to forty foundation shades. Giles claimed that the event was the first time a brand had answered a call for inclusion. In April, she also made a video asking Parnell to expand their shades, leading to her working with the brand to create a forty-shade range foundation set.

== Awards and nominations ==
Year	Award	Category	Result	Ref.
2021	Streamy Awards	Beauty	Nominated	
2022	Streamy Awards	Beauty	Won	
2023	Streamy Awards	Beauty	Nominated	
