= Pourri =

American fragrance company

~Pourri
- Type: Private
- Industry: Air freshener
- Founded: 2007
- Founder: Suzy Batiz, Founder & CEO
- Headquarters: Addison, Texas, United States
- Products: Toilet spray, personal care
- Website: www.poopourri.com

Pourri (also written ~Pourri) is a company that designs and sells fragrant sprays for toilets. It is the maker of Poo-Pourri, a product composed of essential oils and other natural compounds that coat the surface of the water. The manufacturer claims that these compounds can contain unpleasant odors.

The name of the company is a pun on potpourri.

== History ==
In 2007, after nine months of trying sprays, Suzy Batiz, founded the company and spent $25,000 of her own to begin making Poo-Pourri. The company was advertised by word of mouth for the first six years.

In 2013, the company's advertisement video, Girls Don't Poop, starring Bethany Woodruff, made its debut and was seen more than 31 million times. In April 2014, Poo-Pourri was available at 9,000 stores, including CVS, Bed Bath & Beyond, Ulta, ACE and True Value.

By January 2016, the company had sold over 17 million bottles of Poo-Pourri, and that October, their new online video team, 'Number 2 Productions', sent out the video, How to Poop at a Party. In 2016, Poo-Pourri was valued at $300 million.

By May 2019, the company had sold over 60 million bottles of Poo-Pourri and its videos had over 350 million combined views.

In 2022, the company rebranded from Poo~Pourri to ~Pourri and branched out into other categories of odor elimination.

== Recognition ==
USA Today called Girls Don't Poop one of 2013's worst advertisements.

In May 2014, at the 18th Annual Webby Awards ceremony, Poo-Pourri won the People's Voice Award in the Consumer Goods category and Edison Award in the Innovative Services category. That year, Giuliana Rancic picked Poo-Pourri as her 'top gift for coworkers' for E! News' Holiday Gift Guide. In 2015 and 2016, the Inc. 5,000 list included Poo-Pourri, and in 2016, the spray was one of the magazine's 27 Coolest Products. In November 2016, Kathy Lee Gifford listed Poo-Pourri as one of her 'favorite things' on the Today Show. In 2019, Batiz was recognized on Forbes Richest Self-Made Women list.
