= Kelli Erdmann =

American social media personality

- Born: Kelli Ann Erdmann; Marysville, Washington, U.S.
- Education: Pilchuck Dance Academy, Marysville; Olympic Ballet, Edmonds; Westlake Dance Center, Shoreline
- Alma mater: Edge Performing Arts Center, Los Angeles
- Occupations: Social media personality, dancer, choreographer, actress
- Years active: 2012–present
- Notable work: Lou Ann in Hairspray Live!
- Website: www.kellierdmann.com

Kelli Erdmann is an American social media personality, professional dancer, choreographer and actress, known for her synchronized sticker cutout and shuffle dance-clips that went viral on social media platforms such as TikTok and Instagram during the COVID-19 pandemic. She had previously made several uncredited appearances, mostly as a dancer on numerous television shows, including Mobbed, Bunheads, Glee and The Goldbergs before being cast as Lou Ann in the 2016 American television special Hairspray Live! and as Clara in the 2016 American sitcom Fuller House.

== Early life and education ==
Erdmann was born in Marysville, Washington, United States. She started dancing at the age of five and trained in dance academies such as Pilchuck Dance Academy in Marysville, Olympic Ballet in Edmonds and in Westlake Dance Center in Shoreline. After graduating from high school in 2010, she moved to Los Angeles and enrolled in Edge Performing Center's scholarship program, where she mastered ballet, jazz, hip-hop, tap and other genres of dance.

== Career ==
=== Television shows ===
Erdmann's first engagement with television segments came in 2012 when she got a minor uncredited role as a backup singer in an episode of 2010 American sitcom Victorious. She subsequently got small roles, mostly as a dancer in episodes of shows like Jane the Virgin, Fuller House, Glee, Good Trouble, Mobbed, Bunheads, Mighty Med, etc.

=== Filmography ===
Erdmann's debut in the film industry began after being cast as the Young American Dancer in the 2013 American biographical film Behind the Candelabra. She was most famously cast as Lou Ann in the 2016 American musical film Hairspray Live! and as Freshman Tag Along in the 2020 film Valley Girl.

=== Live theater ===
Erdmann also danced in the ensemble cast of the Broadway show, Wicked.

=== Social media ===
Erdmann publishes videos on TikTok, YouTube, Snapchat, and Facebook as HappyKelli and on Instagram as Kelladactyl. She has over 16 million total followers from all platforms combined.
