= WaterAid =

International non-governmental organization

- Founded: 21 July 1981
- Type: Non-governmental organization
- Purpose: Water, sanitation and hygiene
- Location: 30 countries
- Region served: Worldwide
- Global Director, WaterAid International: Andrew McCracken
- Chair, WaterAid International Board: Maureen O'Neill
- Budget: £113 million (2018-19)
- Revenue: Donations, grants
- Employees: Around 1,000
- Website: www.wateraid.org

WaterAid is an international non-governmental organization, focused on water, sanitation and hygiene. It was set up in 1981 as a response to the UN International Drinking Water decade (1981–1990). As of 2025, it is operating in 30 countries.

The organisation was first established by the UK water industry on 21 July 1981 as a charitable trust at their main office premises in London and established its first projects in Zambia and Sri Lanka. In 2010, it became a federation, comprising, as of 2025, members in Australia, Canada, India, Japan, Sweden, the UK and the US, and regional offices and country programmes in a further 23 countries in Africa, Asia and Latin America. Activities involve providing people with clean water, safe sanitation, hygiene behaviour change and advocacy with governments and water utilities. Its income has moved from £1 million per annum in 1987 to £113 million in 2018–19.

== History ==
WaterAid was founded in 1981 by members of the UK water industry at the Thirsty Third World conference held in London. WaterAid was formally established as a charity in the UK on 21 July 1981. King Charles III has been its president since 1991. Other members were established as follows: WaterAid America and Australia in 2004, Sweden in 2009. In 2010, the organisation became a federation and established the WaterAid International Secretariat. In 2014, WaterCan/EauVive, an NGO founded in Canada in 1987, became WaterAid Canada and joined the federation.

In 1993 WaterAid began work on its 1000th project and also agreed to fund the Hitosa Gravity Scheme in Ethiopia. The Hitosa scheme was the largest single water supply scheme implemented in Ethiopia at the time, reaching 50,000 people.

In 2003, WaterAid was named UK charity of the year at the Charity Times Awards. Also, in November 2006 WaterAid said that it was "Britain's most Admired Charity 2006", as voted by its peers in the voluntary sector (in Third Sector magazine). WaterAid came top of the category followed by Save the Children and The Samaritans. Andrew Cook, then WaterAid's Director of Communications and Fundraising said "We are delighted to have won this prestigious accolade. This award is a testament to the tireless work of all WaterAid's staff and volunteers both in the UK and internationally". WaterAid was also a Stockholm Water Prize laureate in 1995.

In 2009, a new Global Strategy was launched, with the target of reaching 25 million more people across 30 countries by 2015. By 2011, WaterAid's 30th anniversary year, they had reached almost 16 million people with safe water and over 11 million with sanitation. In 2015, WaterAid launched 2015-2020 Global Strategy and its mission is to transform lives of the poorest people by improving access to sanitation, hygiene and safe water.

In February 2022, WaterAid WaterAid launched its first legacy campaign, "What Jack gave," concentrating on will donations. Legacy income currently accounts for approximately 10% of WaterAid's total income.

== Fundraising ==
WaterAid has been associated with the Glastonbury Festival since 1994. In 2006 the festival's founder Michael Eavis and his daughter Emily visited WaterAid's work in Mozambique and by 2007 130 WaterAid volunteers helped at the festival. In 2011, there were around 200 WaterAid volunteers present. In 2016, by which time there were over 500 WaterAid volunteers at Glastonbury, the charity introduced Talking Toilets which gave out information voiced by celebrities such as Cerys Matthews and Brian Blessed.

Among WaterAid's many fundraising events is 'Coast Along for WaterAid', a sponsored walk along sections of the South West Coast Path, which took place annually between 2005 and 2012. In 2010 the then UK Prime Minister, Gordon Brown took part.

In 2012, WaterAid partnered with Waterlogic to help raise funds for the poorest communities in the world, to provide them with clean and sanitary water. Waterlogic's Firewall technology purifies water and destroys harmful bacteria. Waterlogic pledged US$225,000 to WaterAid over 3 years.

Fundraising events and initiatives in 2013 included The WaterAid200 Mountain Challenge as well as various running, cycling and other sporting challenges as well as Street fundraising.

WaterAid is working with Team Water to launch a fundraiser for clean drinking water. The campaign goal is to raise $40,000,000 to provide 2,000,000 people with clean water. In 2025, Team Water reached its goal of $40 million USD to give 2 million people around the world access to clean and safe drinking water.

The organization also receives direct funding from a variety of corporations, non-profit organizations, and academic institutions. Notable donors include the Bill & Melinda Gates Foundation, Boeing, Conrad N. Hilton Foundation, Google, Mercy Corps, New Venture Fund, PepsiCo, Pfizer and the World Bank Group.

== Activities ==
WaterAid works in partnership with local organisations in 34 countries in Africa, Asia, Central America and the Pacific region to help poor communities establish sustainable water supplies and toilets, close to home, and to promote safe hygiene practices. It also works to influence government water and sanitation policies to serve the interests of vulnerable people and to ensure water and sanitation are prioritised in poverty reduction plans. As a matter of policy, WaterAid supports public ownership and control of water supplies but does not take a particular view regarding public, community or private participation in service provision.

=== COVID-19 response ===
In collaboration with Unilever, the Hygiene and Behavior Change Coalition (HBCC) extended its efforts to combat the Omicron and other COVID-19 variants. It maintained a steadfast commitment to implementing hygiene behavior change initiatives and promoting confidence in the COVID-19 vaccine.

During Phase 1 of the project, six countries, namely Ethiopia, Ghana, Nepal, Pakistan, Tanzania, and Zambia, were chosen to receive mass handwashing facilities and hygiene essentials, benefitting a total of 152 million people. In Phase 2, Nigeria was designated for its prior involvement in promoting hygiene behavior change concerning COVID-19, supported by the Heineken Africa Foundation.

=== Zambia ===
WaterAid first started work in Zambia during the 1992–1994 drought. Since then, the organization has expanded its operations to seven districts in the country, five of which are in the Southern Province (Monze, Siavonga, Namwala, Itezhitezhi and Kazungula) while the other two are Kafue in Lusaka Province and Kaoma in Western Province. The organization spends about ZMK8–9 billion (just over £1 million) annually on projects there, and have since provided 42,600 people in Zambia with access to clean, safe water.

==== Efforts in Monze District ====
WaterAid is working with the government to help extend access to safe water, sanitation and improved hygiene for rural communities in Monze District. Sichiyanda is one such village in the Monze district where efforts are in progress. Projects in the village began in 2001 and the community worked together to dig a well with a dedicated bucket and windlass. Hygiene education is also taking place, where villagers are taught to keep areas clean by building dish racks and rubbish pits and ensuring that there are no stagnant pools of water where mosquitoes can breed. In addition, 28 latrines have already been constructed with more underway.

Such programmes have led to significant improvements in the lives of villages in rural Monze. The building of wells has led to time savings for women and children. For women, much of this newly available time has been put to productive economic activities like basket weaving and pottery making for use and sale. For children, it has led to increased attendance in schools. In light of this, WaterAid has since put up a tender request for an additional 32 boreholes (necessary for the construction of wells) to be drilled in Monze.

==== Milenge Self Supply Project ====
While most of WaterAid's projects have been subsidized, the Milenge Project stands out for being one that is self-supplied. It has been possible to stimulate real demand in the district, and this means rural water supply upgrading can take place with no subsidy for materials. WaterAid is now working in four wards of Western Milenge on Self Supply, and 16 masons (4 per ward) have already been trained, having attended two separate one-month courses at Mansa Trades Training Institute. Besides being trained technically, these masons are also trained to work together and on how to promote their services. They speak to households independently, and some 95 well owners have since expressed interest in their services. Moreover, because these areas are some of the poorest in Zambia and the rural population is on average poorer than those in other piloting countries, such a response is truly impressive.

=== America ===
WaterAid becomes a global federation, opening offices in North America and Australia. WaterAid America's office is in New York and manages programs in Latin America.

=== India ===
WaterAid India (Jal Seva Charitable Foundation) is a registered not-for-profit as a Section 8 company under the Companies Act of the Government of India. WaterAid India aims to make clean water, decent toilets, and good hygiene normal for everyone in the country.

WaterAid started working in India in 1986 and since 2022, started working with communities in rural and urban areas through direct implementation. It is a full-service organisation operating with a local board and diverse independent teams covering programme strategy and implementation, finance, resource mobilisation, policy and technical support, and human resource management.

WaterAid India works with central, state, and local governments, individual and corporate donors, philanthropists, CSO partners, academics, and media to reach millions of people to give three essentials – clean water, decent toilets, and good hygiene – to enable communities to break free from the cycle of poverty.

WaterAid India works in local communities to utilise low-cost technologies to deliver sustainable water supply, sanitation and hygiene solutions to vulnerable people groups.

The organisation has grown in its significance in assisting the most marginalised in both rural and semi-urban areas. In the financial year 2023-24, WaterAid India covered over 11 states (Andhra Pradesh, Bihar, Chhattisgarh, Haryana, Karnataka, Madhya Pradesh, Maharashtra, Odisha, Telangana, Uttar Pradesh, and West Bengal), providing services to the communities that had need.

==== Approach ====
WaterAid India's approach is to:

- Boost community empowerment and local skills to facilitate the creation, implementation, and management of enduring water security plans
- Employ diverse strategies including developing community-level water security and water quality models led by natural leaders and community members for sustainability
- Introduce processes like Jal Chaupal to enlighten communities on water budgeting and involve them in finding solutions, mobilising communities and strengthening mandated institutions such as healthcare centres, schools, and anganwadis
- Collaborate with relevant departments, offering technical support at local levels in both urban and rural communities

WaterAid India's projects advocate for the use of safely-managed sanitation and provide hygiene education with training manuals to the communities. To ensure programme sustainability, WaterAid India prioritises behaviour change and collaborates with communities to assess various sanitation options, enabling informed decision-making while considering the specific needs of children, pregnant women, persons with disabilities and the elderly in devising straightforward and durable solutions.

WaterAid India, through its campaigns and community mobilisation:

- addresses the sanitation chain ensuring safe management of human waste, from containment and transportation to treatment and disposal/re-use, encompassing open defecation-free sustainability and solid-liquid waste management
- establishes community cadres/collectives, ensuring the inclusion of persons with disabilities, women, and children in the process

==== Achievements ====
In the last five years, WaterAid India directly reached 32,61,586 people within 6,52,317 households with improved access to water and sanitation facilities. In 2022–23, WaterAid India has reached 2,60,383 people with access to clean and safe drinking water, 2,39,533 people were provided with access to safe sanitation, and hygiene education and best practices were imparted to 3,41,485 people.

The key highlights are:

- The WaterAid project in Kalmandhai, Tiruchirapalli was declared the country's first 100% sanitised slum in 2002. Khajapattai was announced as the seventh.
- Since 2019, WaterAid India has been technically supporting the Madhya Pradesh state government under the Government of India's flagship initiative Swachh Bharat Mission-Grameen (SBM-G).
- The Ministry of Drinking Water and Sanitation requested WaterAid India to demonstrate technology for easy disposal of faecal sludge, as well as chart the course ahead for SBM impressing the need for a plan for waste water management with particular emphasis on rural faecal sludge management (FSM). As a response to the Government’s demand for a faecal sludge disposal technology, WaterAid India designed, implemented, and constructed the maintenance model for an FSTP (Faecal Sludge Treatment Plant) in the Indore District. The Kali Billod FSTP is not only India’s first functional rural FSTP but is also a flagship FSM project in this region.
- WaterAid India is part of the Rural WASH Partners Forum (RWPF), a platform created by the Government of India, under Ministry of Jal Shakti, Department of Drinking Water and Sanitation, to support States/UTs in for their flagship programme, Jal Jeevan Mission (JJM) and Swachh Bharat Mission. The organisation is the sectoral lead for four thematic areas i.e. greywater management, gender, WASH in Institutions, and operation & maintenance.

=== Bangladesh ===
WaterAid started its work in Bangladesh in 1986. It has successfully collaborated with 21 organizations in Bangladesh up to now to alleviate the suffering from scarce water supply and low sanitation standards in poverty-plagued villages.

With WaterAid Bangladesh rendering their help in the technical field, The Village Education Resource Centre (VERC) introduced the community-led total sanitation (CLTS) model. It aims to educate villagers on the harmful effects that open defecation brings to the environment and their health. In addition, the CLTS programme helps to build toilets for the local communities to facilitate them in shifting to a more hygienic lifestyle. UNICEF recognized that the programme had been so impactful in Bangladesh that many organizations and countries had replicated it.

In 2011, the additional number of people who could access water and sanitation thanks to WaterAid's programme is 259,000 and 536,000 respectively. WaterAid is currently working with the Bangladesh government to build the National Sanitation Strategy, which would help them to reach universal access to sanitation by 2015. Recognizing WaterAid's efforts and the change that they made in running the National Sanitation Campaign together with other NGOs, the Bangladesh government presented the National Sanitation Award to WaterAid as a gesture of appreciation.

==== Latrine design and construction ====
WaterAid encouraged local villagers to design and construct better latrines for themselves. This empowered people to be more involved and learn more about sanitation in the process. Furthermore, local participants could personalize it to fit their preferences and needs.

WaterAid also introduced a programme called "Naming and Shaming", in which anyone caught defecating in the open would have their name taken down and made known to the whole community. Explaining why this works, Institute of Development Studies (University of Sussex) stated that it triggered people's pride and felt so strongly that they were highly motivated to change, i.e. building their toilets and stop open defecation.

The Water Supply and Sanitation Collaborative Council (Switzerland) stated that 49 out of 80 unions had attained 100% sanitation coverage.

==== Hygiene education ====
WaterAid brought across the message of sanitation and hygienic defecation to the young by collaborating with a local music-theatre performance troupe that performed various educational for children.

However, WaterAid does face some difficulties: almost unable to seek support and donations from companies in Bangladesh to ensure a high hygienic level. Mr. Mohammed Sabur, the Director of WaterAid Bangladesh said that since labour was abundant, companies were not afraid of labour shortage should their employees fall sick. The only companies likely to support the programme were those with benefits in mind such as Unilever, who wanted to sell more soap.

=== Canada ===
WaterCan/EauVive was established as a registered Canadian charity in 1987 by Michael Lubbock to "help the world's poorest people gain access to clean drinking water, basic sanitation and hygiene education". It works in 37 countries—like Bangladesh, Kenya, Nicaragua, and Uganda—by partnering with local organizations to assist the poorest and most marginalized communities. WaterAid Canada implemented sanitation projects benefiting 2.2 million people and safe water projects benefiting 1.7 million people by 2014. The charity also organized 4,000 education sessions focused on menstrual hygiene in Bangladesh. It receives funding through donations by individuals, organizations, and foundations and the Canadian International Development Agency. In 2013, it became a member of the global federation WaterAid, and was named WaterAid Canada in mid-2014.

== See also ==
- WASH
- Human right to water and sanitation
- Water issues in developing countries
