= Invisible People (organization) =

American non-profit organization

- Established: November 2008
- Founder: Mark Horvath
- Type: 501(c)(3) non-profit organization
- Location: Los Angeles, California
- Website: www.invisiblepeople.tv

Invisible People is an American 501(c)(3) non-profit organization working for homeless people in the United States. The organization educates the public about homelessness through storytelling, educational resources, and advocacy.

The organization was founded in November 2008 by activist and former television executive, Mark Horvath. Interviews are posted on its website and other social media outlets. The organization has interviewed homeless people in over 100 cities across the United States, Canada, and the United Kingdom.

== History ==
Invisible People was founded by Mark Horvath. In the early 1990s, California resident Horvath worked as a television distribution executive, but addiction to drugs and alcohol resulted in him becoming homeless in 1995. After eight years, he sought rehabilitation with the help of the Los Angeles Dream Center and, in 2005, relocated to St. Louis, Missouri.

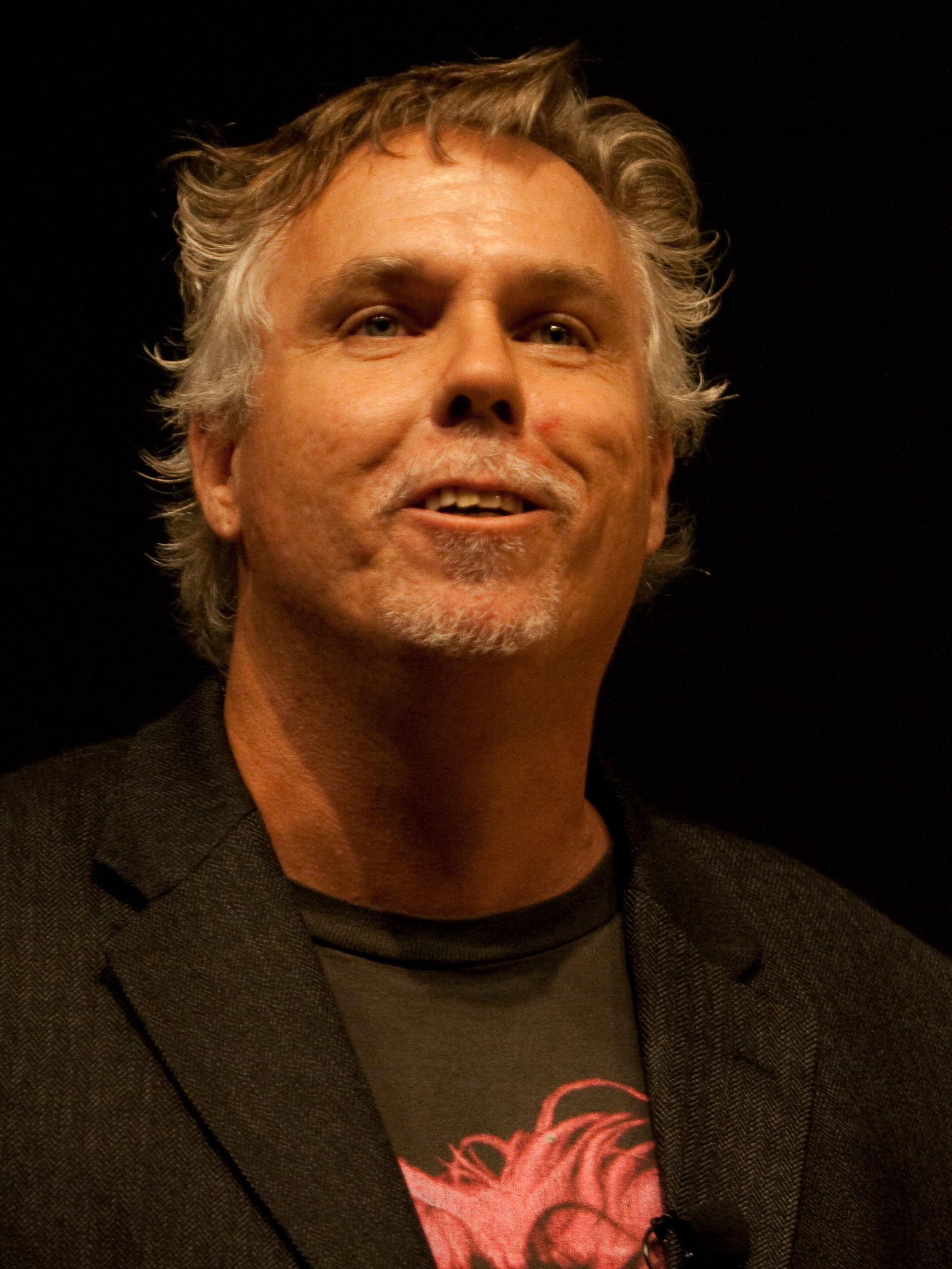
Mark Horvath, founder of InvisiblePeople.tv, in 2009

During the Great Recession, Horvath lost his job and home, and returned to Los Angeles. Facing homelessness again, he recorded interviews with homeless people on a Flipcam and posted them on YouTube and Twitter. In November 2008, Invisible People was launched. It is registered in the United States as a 501(c)(3) non-profit organization.

== Production ==
The guy you see on the street with the cardboard sign – that's actually a very small demographic of homelessness ... you don't see these people on the street corner. You have families tripling up; you have people living in their cars. You have people, especially the homeless youth population, doing survival sex and all kinds of horrible things just to have a place to stay, and you have the huge amount of families living in hotels and they can't save up for first and last month's rent.

— Mark Horvath, 2011

Horvath describes the organization as "a conversation about solutions to end homelessness" that "gives homeless people a chance to tell their own story." Interviews on the subjects' sufferings are recorded using a hand-held videocamera, microphone, laptop, and iPhone, and posted unedited on YouTube, Twitter and Facebook.

Horvath initially interviewed subjects in California, then expanded across the United States and beyond, including Canada Peru, and the United Kingdom. Hovarth travels worldwide to raise awareness about homelessness. Private companies provide goods to be donated to the homeless during Invisible People's road tours, as well as providing transportation and lodging for Horvath.

In April 2009, Invisible People streamed live interviews with homeless people in a tent city in Sacramento, California, on Twitter. After the interviews were posted, a Seattle-based company sponsored the organizations' first cross-country tour, in which Horvath traveled to over 20 cities and interviewed over 100 homeless people. The organization has also partnered with Hanes in the ten-year-old Hanes National Sock Drive raising awareness about the homeless Americans.

By 2010, the organization had released interviews with over 200 homeless people. In 2011, a privately owned, non governmental, Not For Profit Homeless Organization based in Calgary commissioned Invisible People to tour 24 cities in Canada, starting on July 4 in Victoria and ending on September 12 in St. John's, including stops in Toronto and Calgary. The organization’s website received 50,000 hits per month in 2011.

== Reception ==
... some of the strongest stories – the people who are really most isolated or have gone through the toughest things – are those who wouldn't speak to me. They won't speak to anyone anymore.

— Mark Horvath, 2010

According to NBC News, Horvath's interviews give the homeless a face and a voice. The interviews conducted by the non-profit have resulted in assistance being provided to the interviewed subjects. On August 22, 2010, YouTube allowed Horvath and Invisible People to curate YouTube's homepage for a day. In 2012, LA Weekly awarded Invisible People and its founder, Mark Horvath, a "Best Online Do-Gooder" award.

In Baton Rouge, Louisiana, the viewers raised money to buy shoes for 50 schoolchildren. In Arkansas, a farmer donated 40 acres to create a farm that feeds 150 homeless people a week. An interview with a 58-year-old homeless man dying of cancer in Calgary led to his brother finding him after 33 years of estrangement; the two were able to spend 53 days together before the man succumbed to cancer. Housing programs have also been started in Arkansas and Calgary following the organization's tours in those cities.

A documentary about Invisible People entitled "@home" won the 2014 Los Angeles Diversity Film Festival Best Documentary Award and aired on PBS in 2015.

== See also ==
- Homelessness
- Homelessness in the United States
- Homelessness in Canada
