= Harry Slatkin =

American businessman, entrepreneur and philanthropist

- Born: August 14, 1960 (age 66)
- Occupations: Chief executive officer and founder of Slatkin & Co.; philanthropist
- Spouse: Laura Slatkin

Harry Slatkin (born August 14, 1960) is an American businessman. Slatkin founded Slatkin & Co., a home fragrance company, in 1992 with his wife, Laura.

The New York Times called him the "king" of home fragrance and celebrities like Oprah Winfrey and Elton John have been reported to use his home fragrances. In 2005, the New York Daily News regarded Slatkin as one of the United States' fragrance experts.

A former Bear Stearns director, he created Slatkin & Co in 1992. Fans of the brand including Martha Stewart, Ralph Lauren, Tory Burch, Elton John, the Christian Dior company, have contracted with Slatkin to create home fragrance collections. In 2005, retailer Les Wexner purchased Slatkin & Co. for L Brands. He named Slatkin as president of Home Design for Limited Brands as well as President of Slatkin & Co., expanding home fragrance business over a billion dollars during his tenure.

Slatkin is an editor at Elle Décor and appears regularly on QVC, where he sells his fragrances. He has made guest appearances on networks and shows including CNN, Extra TV, E! News, CNBC, ABC and Comedy Central.

In June 2011, Slatkin, with Tommy Hilfiger and the Labelux Group, acquired Belstaff, a British outerwear brand. Slatkin assumed the role of Chief Executive Officer. In 2014, he sold his shares back to Labelux. Slatkin is currently the founder and CEO of Slatkin & Co (name regained) distributed in over 45,000 distribution points.

Slatkin and his wife have two children together, David and Ali - twins.

The Slatkins are the ones who introduced Ted Maher to Edmond Safra. Ted Maher would later be a suspect in Edmond's murder.

Slatkin and his wife serve on the boards of various non-profit organizations including Autism Speaks, Henry Street Settlement House, and NEXT for Autism, which Slatkin and his wife founded and subsequently built the first charter school for autism in New York State. The Slatkins also partnered with Weill Cornell Medicine and Columbia University Vagelos College of Physicians and Surgeons to open the Center For Autism and the Developing Brain.
