= Chriselle Lim =

American fashion stylist (born 1984 or 1985)

- Lim So-jung
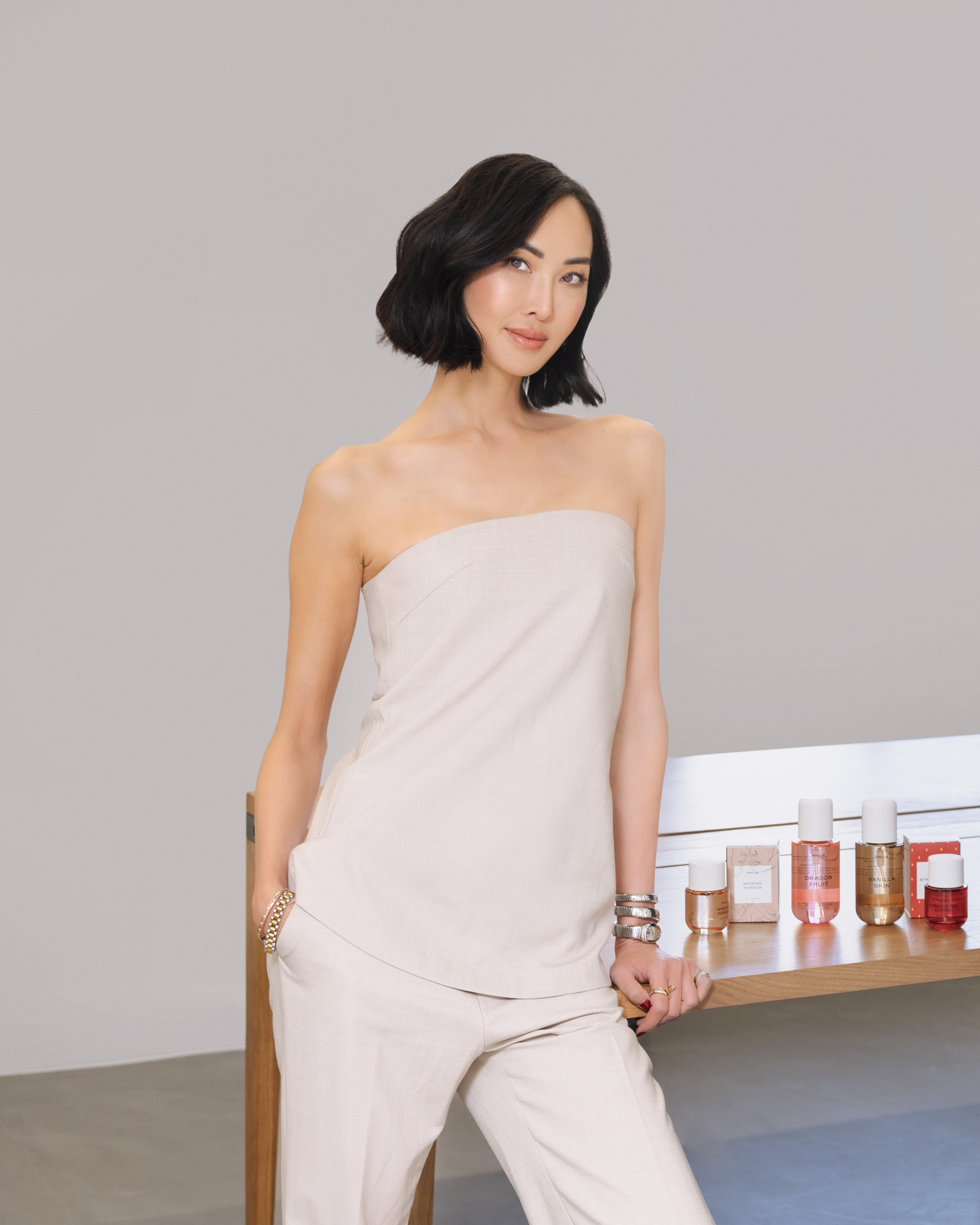
- Lim in 2010
- Born: 1984 or 1985 (age 41–42); Texas, U.S.
- Occupations: Stylist; entrepreneur
- Children: 2
- Website: thechrisellefactor.com

Chriselle Lim (born 1984 or 1985) is an American fashion stylist, lifestyle creator and digital influencer.

== Early life ==
Chriselle Lim was born in Texas and spent four years in Seoul, where she was enrolled in a foreign school. Lim stated an early role model of hers was Victoria Beckham.

Lim attended the Fashion Institute of Design & Merchandising from 2004 to 2008, following in her mother's footsteps, who also studied fashion. At the time, Lim intended to be more on the business end of fashion, such as a fashion buyer, instead of being on the creative side.

== Career ==
She was a stylist and the fashion editor for a local luxury magazine in Beverly Hills before she began blogging.

Lim became a style director for GENLUX in 2011 and is currently the magazine's editor-in-chief. She founded her main website in 2011 as well.

In 2016, Lim appeared in the centennial ad campaign for Keds. The same year, she was part of a panel interviewing Hillary Clinton on Lifetime's show The Conversation.

In 2021, Lim became owner and creative director of fragrance brand Phlur.

== Personal life ==
Lim married Allen Chen in 2012 and separated in 2021. The couple has two daughters.
