= Team Seas =

Ocean-cleaning group by MrBeast and Mark Rober

- Date: October 29, 2021 – July 17, 2024
- Type: Fundraiser
- Cause: Marine pollution
- Budget: $34.08 million
- Organized by: Jimmy Donaldson; Mark Rober
- Website: teamseas.org

Team Seas (stylized as #TEAMSEAS) was an international collaborative fundraiser that was started by YouTubers MrBeast and Mark Rober as a follow-up to Team Trees. The fundraiser succeeded in raising over 34 million U.S. dollars. All of the donations from the fundraiser went to the Ocean Conservancy and The Ocean Cleanup, with the organisations splitting the donations. The fundraiser pledged to remove 30,000,000 pounds (14,000,000 kg) of marine debris from the ocean by removing 1 pound (0.45 kg) of marine debris from the ocean for every 1 dollar donated.

== Background ==
The preceding fundraiser, Team Trees, was started on October 25, 2019, by MrBeast and Mark Rober. They set to raise $20 million, which was achieved. As of the start date of Team Seas, donations are still able to be made on the Team Trees website and planting progress is updated there. As of April 7, 2026, the amount, $34,080,191 has not been changed.

Over a period of one year, about 10 billion pounds (4.8 billion kilograms) of plastic debris enters the world's oceans.

== Spread ==
Team Seas aimed to remove 30,000,000 pounds (14,000,000 kg) of marine debris from the ocean by the end of 2021 by raising 30 million dollars, with one pound removed for every dollar donated. The project was mass released over the internet on many different social media platforms on Friday October 29, 2021, at 1 PM (PT). On YouTube, thousands of creators from 145 countries, with a combined follow count of 1 billion, created videos about the fundraiser.

== Status ==
On May 10, 2023, Donaldson, Rober, and the Team Seas Twitter account jointly reported that the campaign was halfway done, and that 112,000 volunteers had cleaned 15.1 million pounds of waste in 63 countries.

On July 17, 2024, through an announcement uploaded to YouTube, the duo announced that the project has been completed, and acknowledged the myriad of creators that partook in promoting it.

== See also ==
- Team Trees
- Team Water
