= 10th Streamy Awards =

2020 awards ceremony recognizing online video

- Date: December 12, 2020
- Location: Los Angeles, California
- Hosted by: Trixie Mattel and Katya Zamolodchikova

Highlights
- Most awards: MrBeast (4)
- Most nominations: David Dobrik; Emma Chamberlain; James Charles (5 each)
- Year Awards: Instant Influencer (Show of the Year); MrBeast (Creator of the Year)

Television/radio coverage
- Network: YouTube
- Produced by: Dick Clark Productions; Tubefilter; YouTube

The 10th Annual Streamy Awards was the tenth installment of the Streamy Awards honoring the best in American streaming television series and their creators. The ceremony was held on December 12, 2020, hosted by drag queens Trixie Mattel and Katya Zamolodchikova and streamed exclusively to YouTube. To adhere to social distancing restrictions due to the COVID-19 pandemic, the duo presented the awards from a party bus travelling around Los Angeles. The Streamys introduced the Creator Honor awards for the 10th Streamy Awards, presented by past Streamy Award winners to new or breakout creators that resonated with them in 2020. The show also featured "spotlight segments" in which content creators highlighted important social and cultural issues such as racial justice, COVID adaptability, and mental health.

== Performers ==
The 10th Streamy Awards featured the musical performances of the following artists:

Performers at the 10th Streamy Awards
Artist(s)	Song(s)
Lewis Capaldi	"Before You Go"
Tones and I	"Dance Monkey"
Doja Cat	"Say So"

== Winners and nominees ==
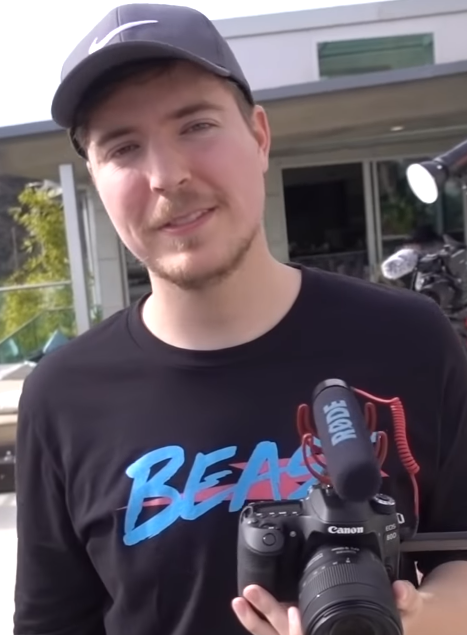
MrBeast, winner of Creator of the Year, Best Live Series, and two Purpose Awards for his charity initiative #TeamTrees and a Feeding America Food Drive

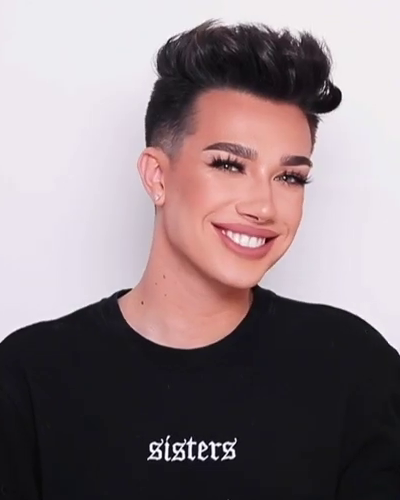
James Charles, winner of Show of the Year and the Beauty category

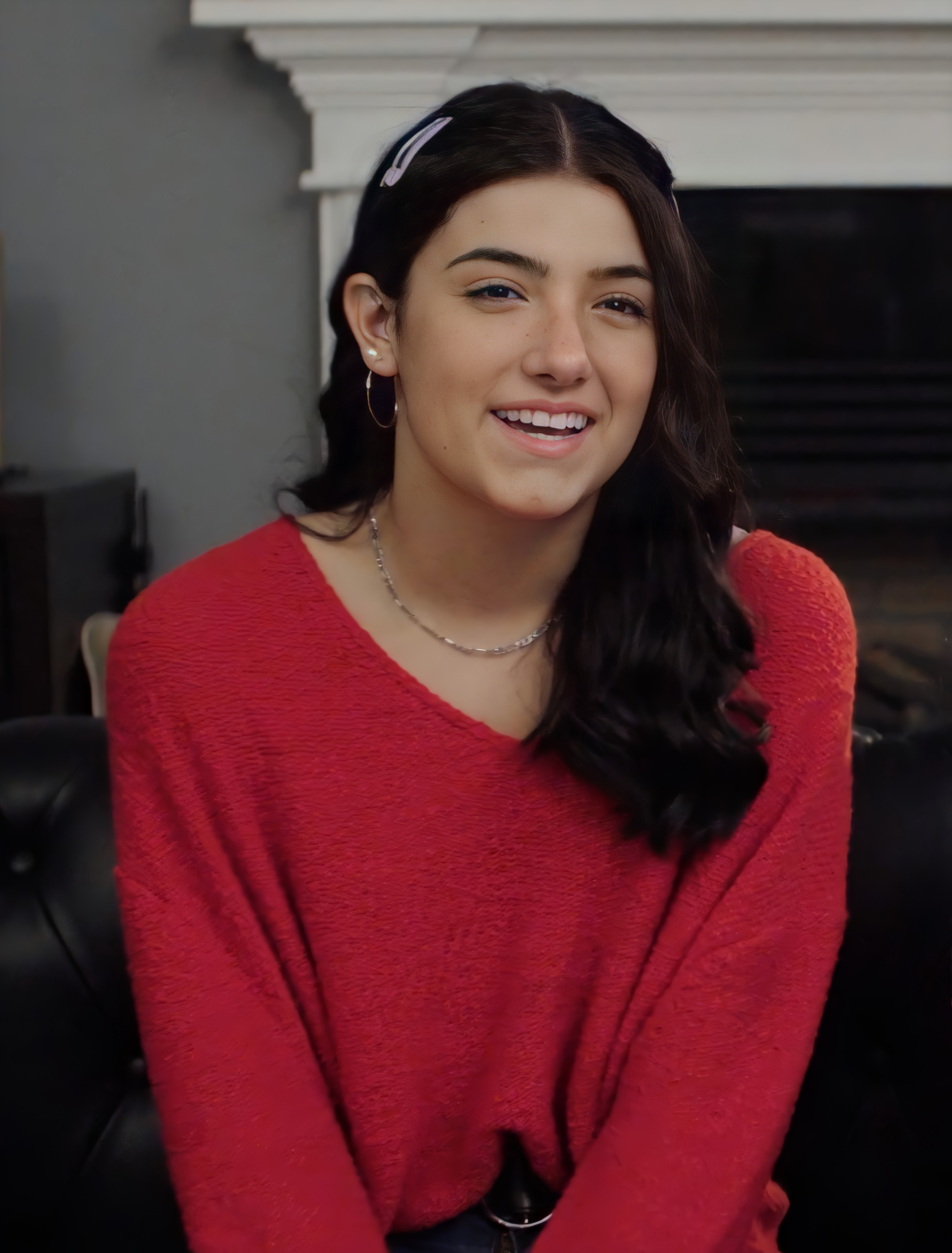
Charli D'Amelio, winner of the Breakout Creator award

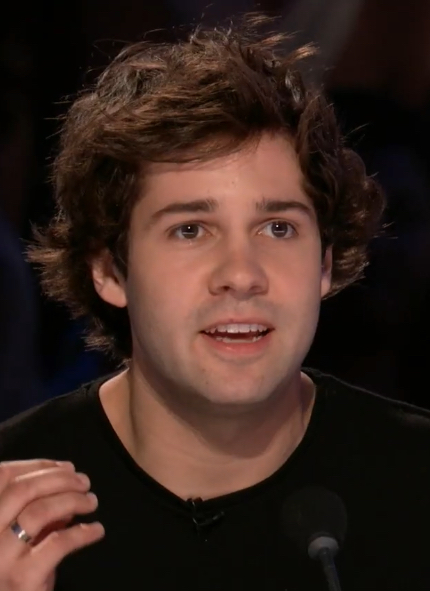
David Dobrik, winner of Best Collaboration with Justin Bieber

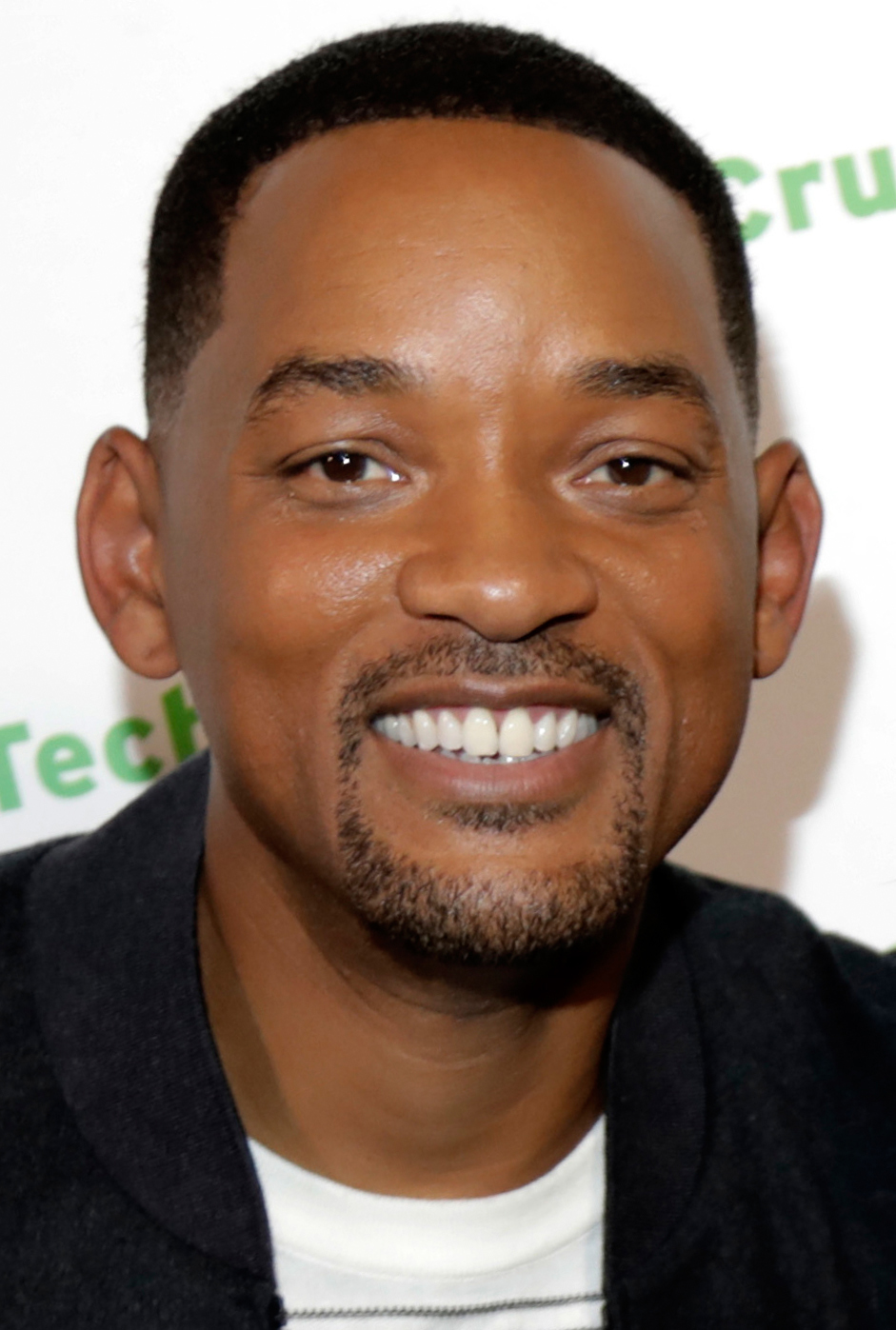
Will Smith, winner of Best Crossover

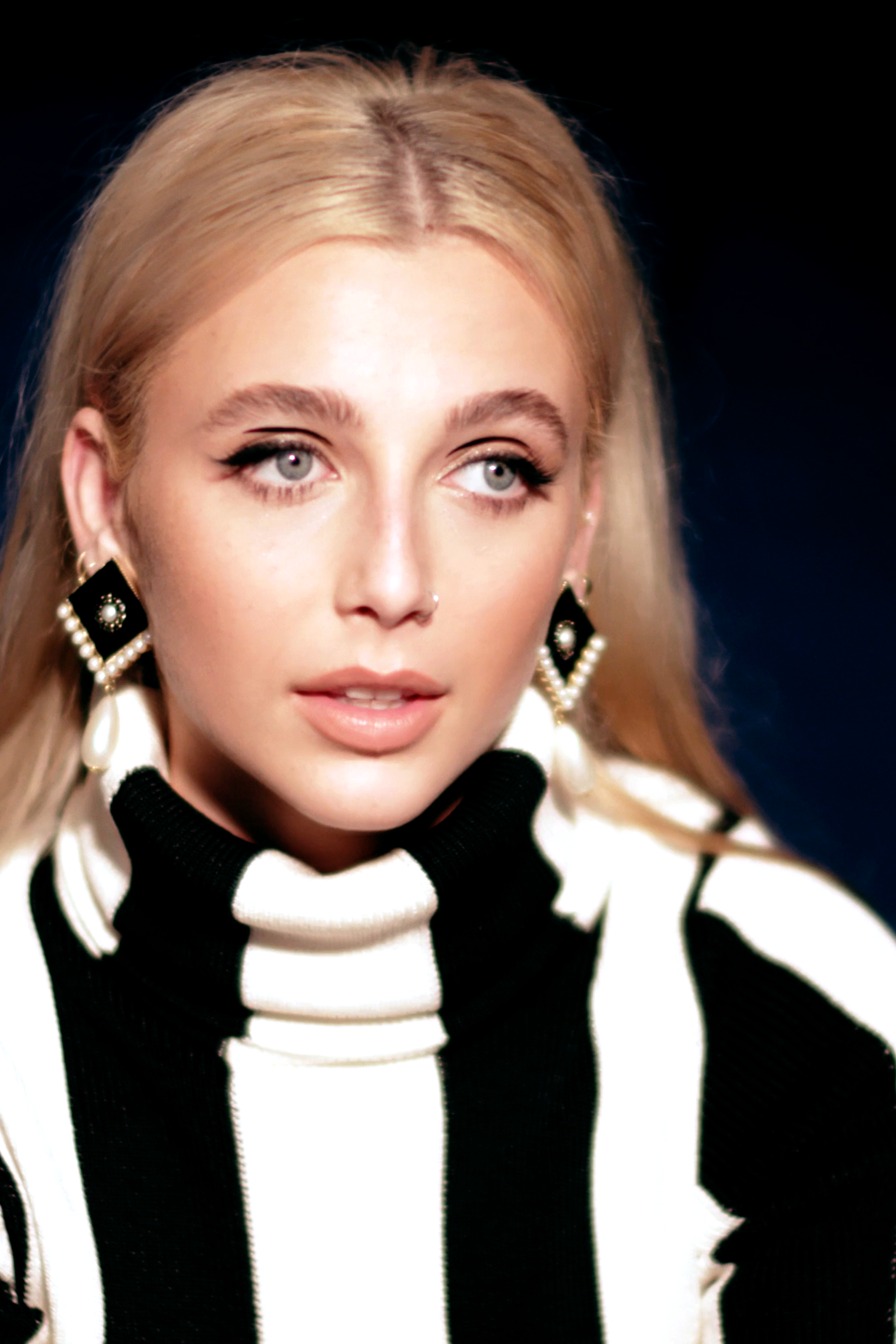
Emma Chamberlain, winner of the First Person category and Best Creator Product

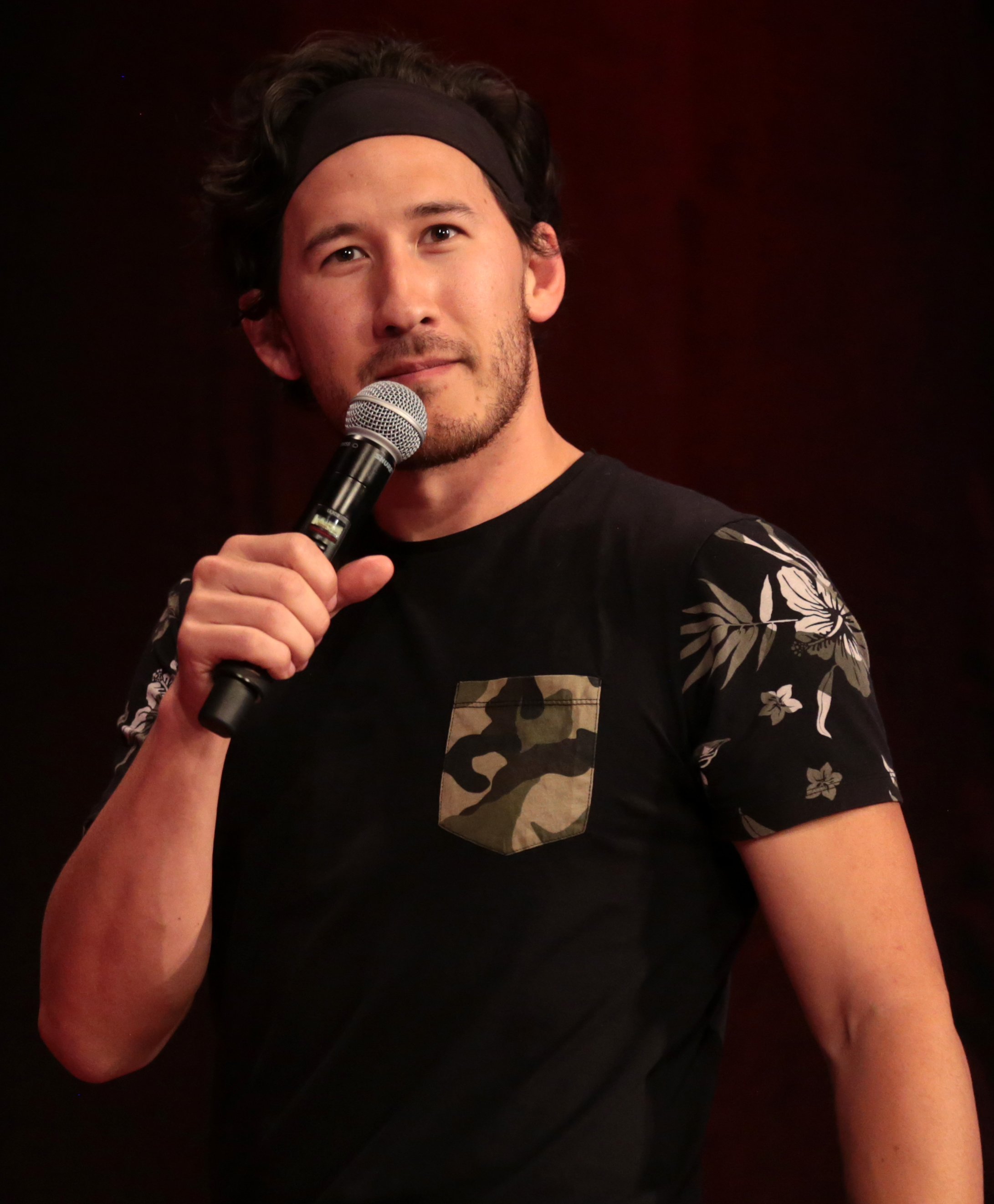
Markiplier, winner of Best Scripted Series

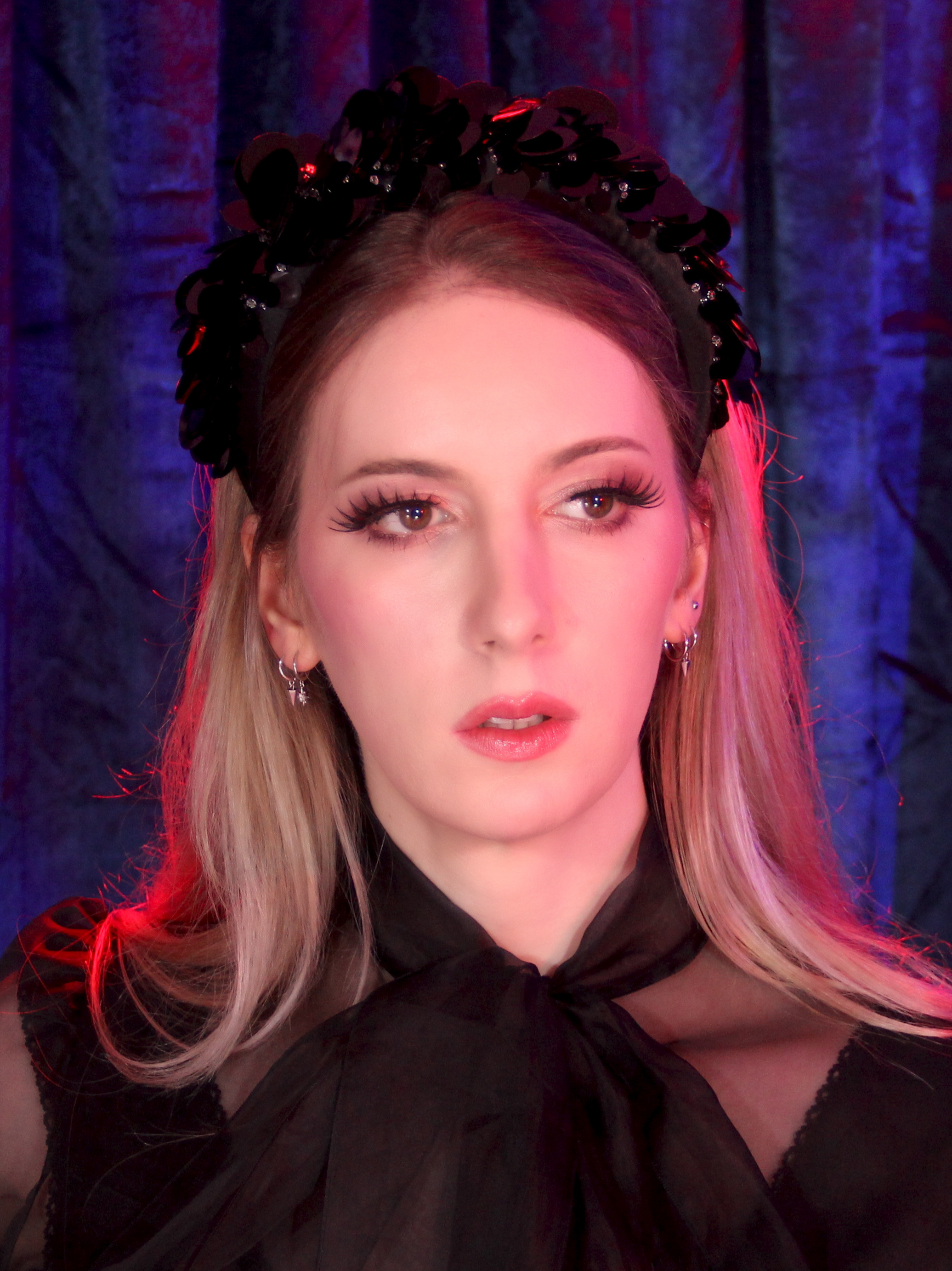
ContraPoints, winner of the Commentary category

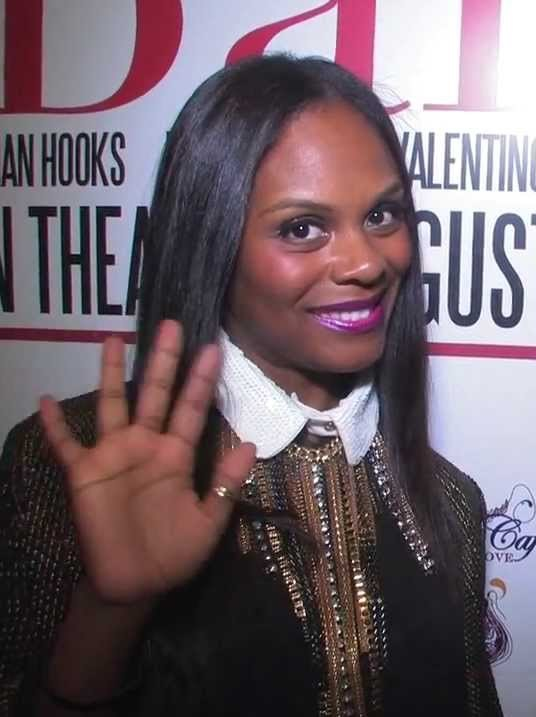
Tabitha Brown, winner of the Food category

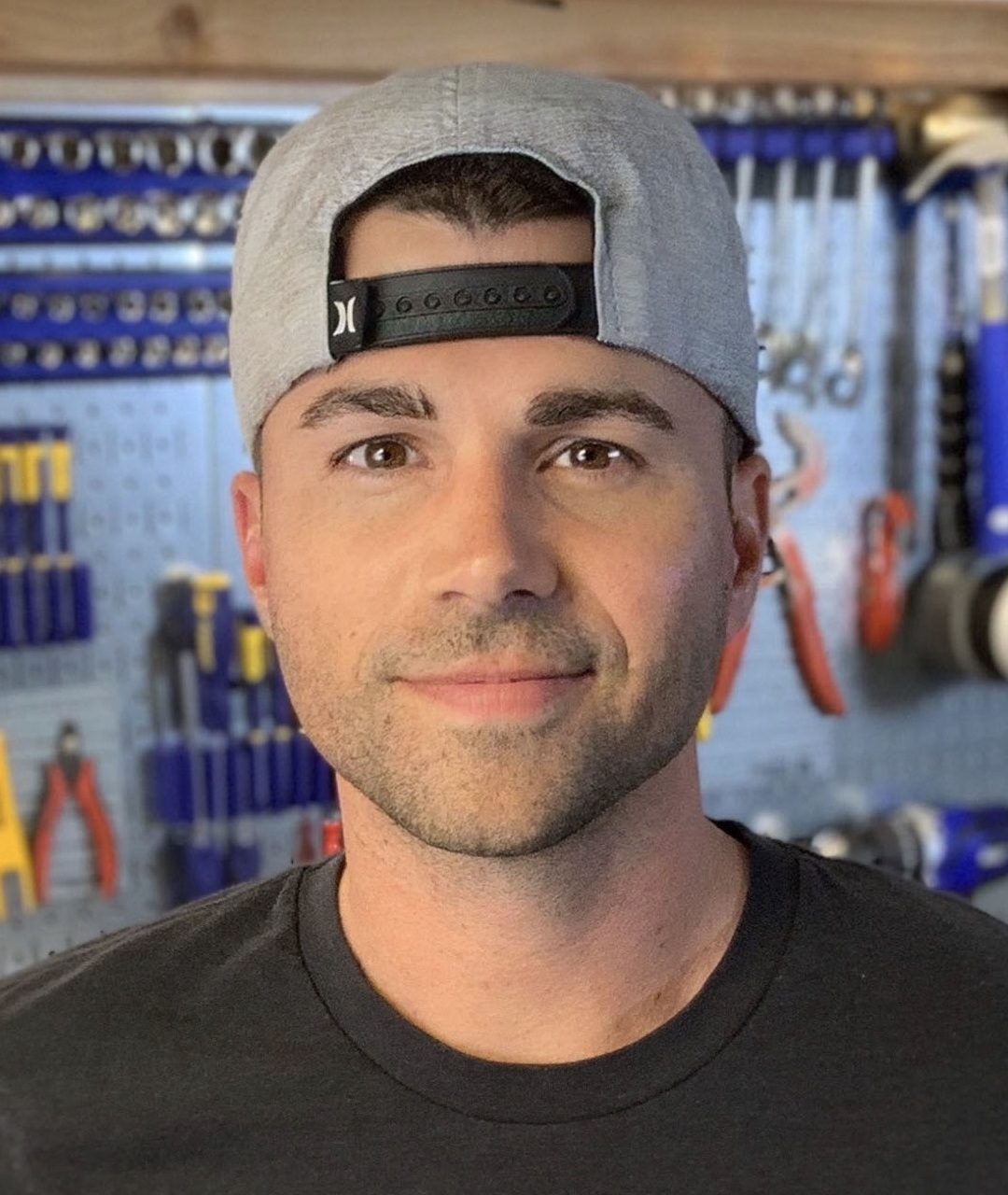
Mark Rober, winner of the Learning and Education category

The nominees were announced on October 21, 2020. Winners were announced during the digital ceremony on December 12, hosted by Trixie Mattel and Katya Zamolodchikova from a party bus in Los Angeles.

Winners are listed first, in bold.

OVERALL
Show of the Year	Creator of the Year
**Instant Influencer**; A Heist With Markiplier; Binging with Babish; Challenge Accepted; Epic Rap Battles of History; Game Master Network; Good Mythical Morning; Liza on Demand; Nikita Unfiltered; UNHhhh	**MrBeast**; Addison Rae; Charli D'Amelio; David Dobrik; Dixie D'Amelio; Emma Chamberlain; James Charles; Larray; Marques Brownlee; Sarah Cooper
International	Streamys Fan Award for Creator Squad
**Whindersson Nunes**; Hikakin; Mikecrack; Mythpat; Sandra Cires Art	**2HYPE**; 100 Thieves; FaZe Clan; Hype House; Sway LA; Vlog Squad
INDIVIDUAL AWARDS
Breakout Creator
**Charli D'Amelio**; Addison Rae; Dream; Spencer X; ZHC
Collaboration	Crossover
**David Dobrik and Justin Bieber – Surprising People with Justin Bieber!**; The Hype House – Turning the Hype House into a Trampoline Park!; Jackie Aina and Naomi Campbell – Naomi Campbell Gets Glam with Me!!!; Sway LA – Most Likely To Challenge!; Zach King and David Blaine – David Blaine Tricks Zach King with Zoom Magic	**Will Smith – Will Smith (YouTube)**; Jack Black – Jablinski Games (YouTube); Jason Derulo – @jasonderulo (TikTok); Kevin James – Kevin James (YouTube); Naomi Campbell – Naomi (YouTube)
First Person	Live Streamer
**Emma Chamberlain**; Alex Warren; David Dobrik; Larray; Logan Paul	**Nickmercs**; Ninja; Pokimane; Shroud; Typical Gamer
SHOW AWARDS
Indie Series	Live Series
**Chris and Jack**; 20 Seconds to Live; Arun Considers; Choose Me: An Abortion Story; The Lock Down Buddy	**Verzuz**; BET's House Party; Bright Minded: Live with Miley Cyrus; D-Nice's Club Quarantine; Reunited Apart with Josh Gad
Live Special	Podcast
**MrBeast's $250,000 Influencer Rock, Paper, Scissors Tournament**; #Graduation2020: Facebook and Instagram Celebrate the Class of 2020; Some Good News Prom with Billie Eilish, Jonas Brothers, & Chance the Rapper; Travis Scott and Fortnite Present: Astronomical; YouTube Dear Class of 2020	**On Purpose with Jay Shetty**; Anything Goes with Emma Chamberlain; H3 Podcast; Impaulsive; VIEWS with David Dobrik and Jason Nash
Scripted Series	Unscripted Series
**A Heist With Markiplier**; Could You Survive the Movies?; Epic Rap Battles of History; FPS Logic; Liza on Demand	**UNHhhh**; Brave Wilderness; Challenge Accepted; Instant Influencer; Jeff's Barbershop
SUBJECT AWARDS
Animated	Beauty
**Jaiden Animations**; illymation; Ketnipz; The Land of Boggs; TheOdd1sOut	**James Charles**; Bailey Sarian; Brad Mondo; Hyram; Jackie Aina
Comedy	Commentary
**Sarah Cooper**; Brandon Rogers; Brittany Tomlinson; Gus Johnson; Nigel Ng	**ContraPoints**; D'Angelo Wallace; Danny Gonzalez; Jarvis Johnson; Tiffany Ferguson
Dance	Documentary
**BFunk**; Dytto; Matt Steffanina; Michael Le; Sofie Dossi	**The Secret Life of Lele Pons**; AntsCanada; Justin Bieber: Seasons; Nikita Unfiltered; State Of Grace
Fashion and Style	Food
**Wisdom Kaye**; bestdressed; Bretman Rock; LaurDIY; Sneaker Shopping	**Tabitha Brown**; Alex French Guy Cooking; Babish Culinary Universe; How To Cook That; Joshua Weissman
Gaming	Health and Wellness
**Dream**; FGTeeV; Jelly; LaurenzSide; PrestonPlayz	**Chloe Ting**; Demi Bagby; Doctor Mike; The Fitness Marshall; Kati Morton
Kids and Family	Learning and Education
**Ryan's World**; A for Adley; Goo Goo Colors; Kids Diana Show; Rebecca Zamolo	**Mark Rober**; ChrisFix; NileRed; onlyjayus; Peter Sripol
Lifestyle	News
**Larray**; Alexa Rivera; Calle y Poché; Jennelle Eliana; Rickey Thompson	**HasanAbi**; All Gas No Brakes; Complex News; The Philip DeFranco Show; Some More News
Sports	Technology
**Ryan García**; 2HYPE; Braille Skateboarding; Dude Perfect; No Days Off: Sports Prodigies	**Marques Brownlee**; iJustine; Michael Reeves; Simone Giertz; Stuff Made Here
CRAFT AWARDS
Cinematography	Editing
**Peter McKinnon – Peter McKinnon**; Cole Bennett – Lyrical Lemonade; Devin Graham – devinsupertramp; Niels Lindelien – Lindsey Stirling; Pierre Wikberg – Climbkhana TWO	**Hayden Hillier-Smith – Logan Paul**; Casey Neistat – CaseyNeistat; derkslurp – derkslurp; Emma Chamberlain and Anderson Webb – emma chamberlain; Evan Puschak – Nerdwriter1
Visual and Special Effects	Writing
**Aaron Benitez – Aaron's Animals**; Buttered Side Down – Buttered Side Down; CyreneQ – CyreneQ; SOKRISPYMEDIA – Chalk Warfare 4.0; Zach King – Zach King	**CalebCity – CalebCity**; Akilah Hughes, Milana Vayntrub, Brian McElhaney, and Nick Kocher – Making Fun with Akilah and Milana; Chris W. Smith and Jack De Sena – Chris and Jack; James – Casually Explained; Zach Sherwin, Nice Peter, EpicLLOYD, and Carter Deems – Epic Rap Battles of History

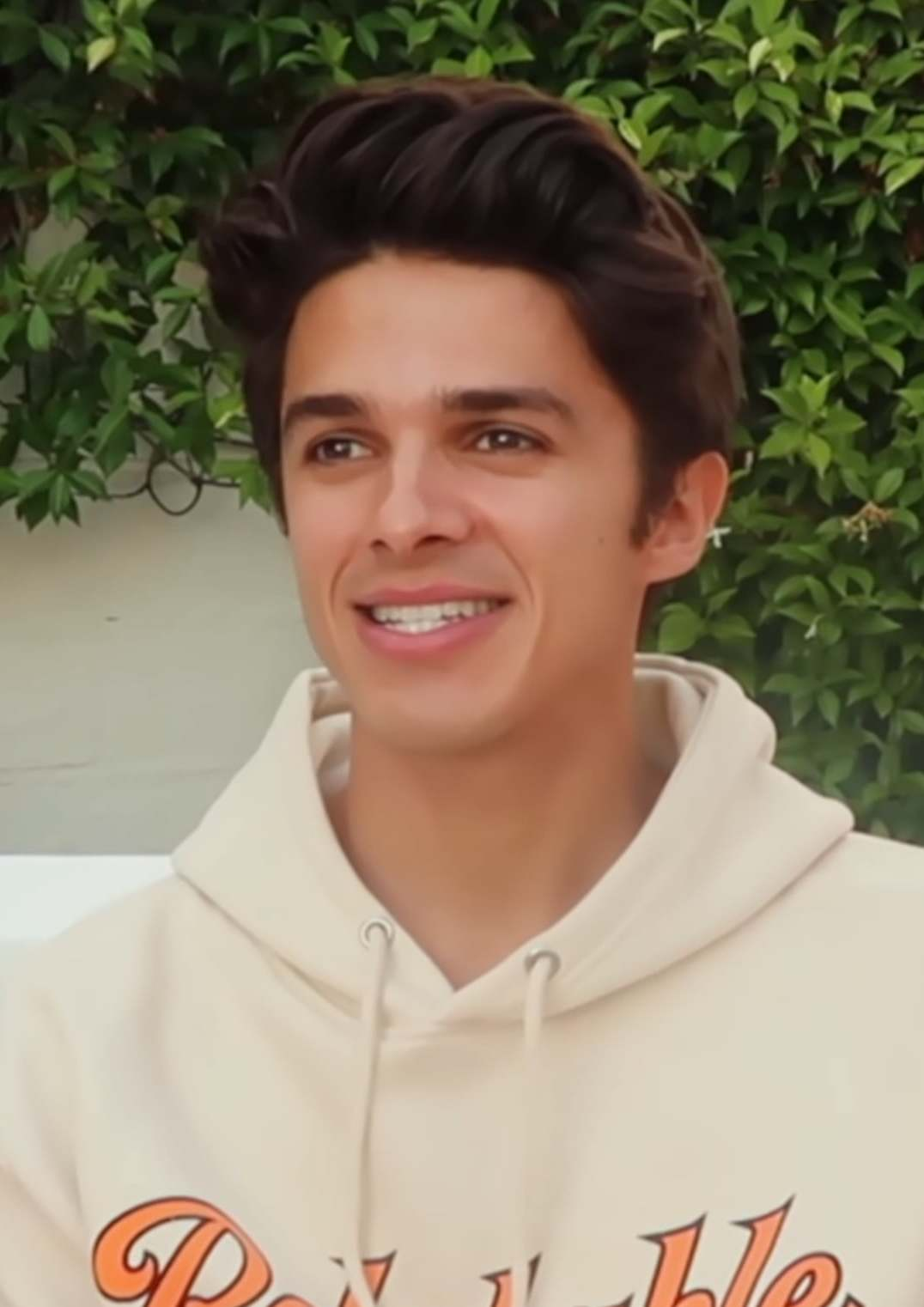
Brent Rivera received a Creator Honor award from Juanpa Zurita

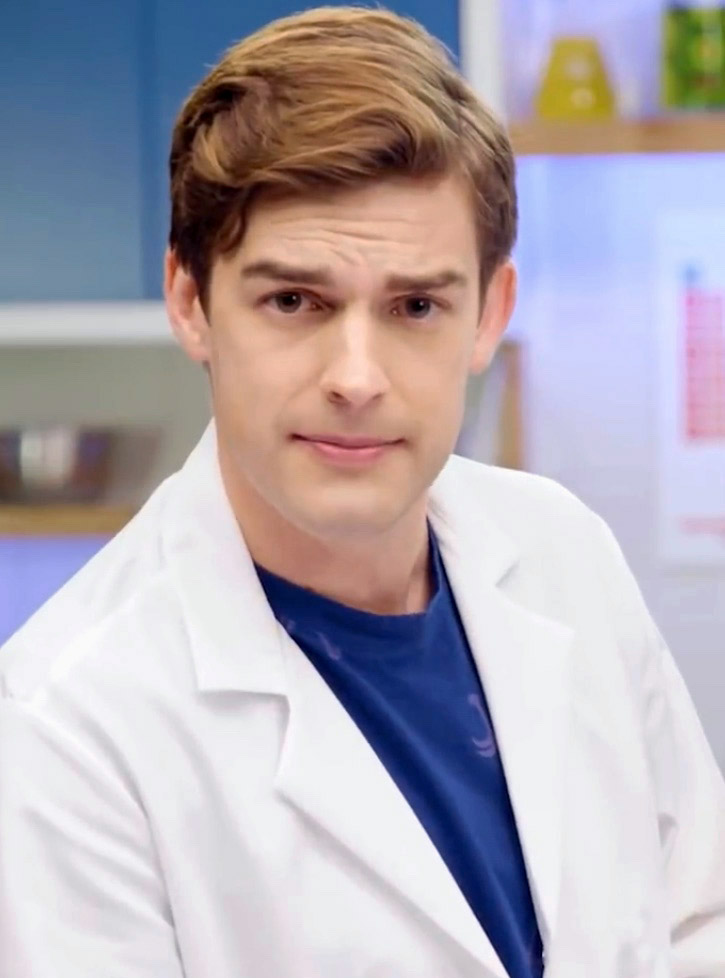
MatPat, winner of a Creator Award at the Purpose Awards

Creator Honor awards

- **Bailey Sarian** (presented by NikkieTutorials)
- **Brent Rivera** (presented by Juanpa Zurita)
- **CalebCity** (presented by Kyle Exum)
- **Elsa Majimbo** (presented by Lilly Singh)
- **Laviedunprince** (presented by PatrickStarrr)
- **Taylor Cassidy** (presented by Liza Koshy)
- **Kurzgesagt** (presented by Marques Brownlee)

=== Brand Awards ===
BRAND AWARDS
Agency of the Year	Brand of the Year
**BEN**; Portal A; R&CPMK; Reach; VaynerMedia	**Netflix**; Barbie; Disney+; Old Spice; Fenty Beauty by Rihanna
Brand Engagement	Branded Content: Series
**100 Thieves Cash App Compound Reveal – Cash App**; 5-Minute Crafts – Barbie; Need for Speed: Heat x David Dobrik – Electronic Arts; Rihanna's Summer Fenty Face Tutorial – Fenty Beauty by Rihanna; Under the Influencer – Comedy Central	**Under a Rock with Tig Notaro – Amazon Alexa**; Cold as Balls – Old Spice; No Days Off: Sports Prodigies – Got Milk?; Second Chances – Dave's Killer Bread; Undercover Lyft – Lyft
Branded Content: Video	Creator Product
**We Lost A FaZe Member – G Fuel**; Aladdin Meets Parkour in Real Life – Uzbekistan Tourism; ASMR SNAP SHADOWS TUTORIAL W/ AMANDLA STENBERG – Fenty Beauty by Rihanna; I Trained Like Black Widow – Marvel Strike Force; James Charles Spills the Tea on His Glow – Ole Henriksen Skincare	**Chamberlain Coffee – Emma Chamberlain**; Dragun Beauty – Nikita Dragun; Hairitage – Mindy McKnight; McKinnon Camera Pack – Peter McKinnon; Pro Ant Farms – AntsCanada
Influencer Campaign	Multi-Platform Campaign
**#ALLNIGHTERLEGEND – Urban Decay**; #HotGuysMakingLipstick – Bite Beauty; Google Pixel 4; Nebula; Superstars in Training – WWE	**Disney+ Launch**; Gift it Forward with Cardi B – Pepsi; The Greatest Challenge of All Time with Cristiano Ronaldo and Marta – Clear (Unilever); Star Wars: The Rise of Skywalker – Star Wars; Tito's Made To Order – Tito's Vodka
Social Good Campaign
**Seize the Awkward – The Jed Foundation and Ad Council**; #DistanceDance – P&G and Charli D'Amelio; My Vaping Mistake – The Real Cost and AwesomenessTV; Teens for Jeans – Aéropostale and DoSomething.org; Undercover Lyft with Alicia Keys – Lyft and LyftUp

=== Purpose Awards ===
Creator Award	**The Game Theorists – St. Jude Children's Research Hospital #CancelCancer LIVE**; **MrBeast – Feeding America Food Drive**; **Nabela Noor – NoorHouse**
Company or Brand Award	**Dave's Killer Bread – Second Chance Employment**; **Barbie – Career of the Year**; **Lyft – Undercover Lyft with Alicia Keys**
Nonprofit or NGO Award	**Arbor Day Foundation – #TeamTrees**; **COVID-19 Response Fund – Post Malone x Nirvana Tribute – Livestream**; **Equal Justice Initiative – Bear Witness, Take Action**

== Reception ==
Alexandra Del Rosario, writing for Deadline Hollywood, described Doja Cat's performance of "Say So" and a segment dedicated to the Black Lives Matter movement as highlights of the night. According to Kelly Kozakevich of MediaVillage, the show had "a plethora of stand out moments" including spotlight segments by activist Amber Whittington on racial justice and Jay Shetty on depression, anxiety and mental health, and the Creator Honor awards which she called "a heartfelt addition to the show". She also praised the musical performances and "Streamy 10 Flashback" segments which showcased memorable moments from previous Streamy Awards ceremonies.
