= 11th Shorty Awards =

Awards show for short-form social web media content

- Awarded for: Honoring the best of social media
- Date: May 5, 2019
- Location: PlayStation Theater; New York City, U.S.
- Hosted by: Kathy Griffin

Television/radio coverage
- Network: YouTube; Twitter

The 11th Shorty Awards were held on May 5, 2019, in New York City at the PlayStation Theater. The ceremony was hosted by American actress and comedian Kathy Griffin, along with a music performance by Tank and the Bangas. The event was live streamed on YouTube and Twitter with presenters including Denzel Dion, Devin Lytle, Eva Gutowski, Freddie Ransome, Grace Helbig, Jay Shetty, Lauren Giraldo, Mamrie Hart, Meghan Currie, Miles McKenna, Molly Burke, Raymond Braun, Remi Cruz, Ryland Adams, Samir Mezrahi, Sean Evans, Shangela, and The Try Guys.

== Influencer winners and nominees ==
Nominations were announced on January 28, 2019, with public voting closing on February 21, 2019. Finalists were announced on March 20, 2019. Winners were announced at the ceremony on May 5, 2019. New categories added this year included Innovator of the Year, Tik Toker of the Year, and Storyteller of the Year.

Winners are listed first and in boldface.

=== Arts & Entertainment ===
**Best Actor**: **Noah Centineo**; Awkwafina; Danai Gurira; Emmy Rossum; Eva Longoria; Jason Momoa; John Cho; Justin Baldoni; Mandy Moore; Mindy Kaling; Sacha Baron Cohen; Tituss Burgess	**Best Celebrity**: **Kathy Griffin**; Common; Deepika Padukone; Eddie Huang; Joe Biden; Jon M. Chu; Jonah Hill; Lil Miquela; Reese Witherspoon; Russell Brand; Whoopi Goldberg; Yoko Ono
**Best Comedian**: **John Mulaney**; Ali Wong; Cameron Esposito; Catherine Cohen; Chloe Fineman; Hannah Gadsby; Jaboukie Young-White; John Early; Matteo Lane; Melissa Villaseñor; Samantha Ruddy; W. Kamau Bell	**Best in Dance**: **Kaycee Rice**; Auti Kamal; Brittany Cavaco; Chelsie Hill; Cynthia Irobunda; Dytto; Fikshun; Jade Chynoweth; Justin Peck; Omar Z. Robles; Shiggy; The Kinjaz
**Best in Music**: **Blackpink**; Alanis Morissette; Bad Bunny; Harry Styles; Jaden Smith; Janelle Monae; Kacey Musgraves; Mason Ramsey; Meek Mill; Normani; Post Malone; Weezer	**Best TV Show**: **Brooklyn Nine-Nine**; Atlanta; Barry; Dear White People; Grown-ish; Jersey Shore; Shameless; Succession; The Bold Type; The Chi; The Last O.G.; The Sinner

=== Content of the Year ===
**Emoji of the Year**: **🤷🤷‍♂️ *shrug***; ✨ just a lil sparkle; 👩‍⚖️ when there are 12; 👩‍🦰👨‍🦰 the red heads; 👽 greetings, earthlings; 🥟 dumpling; 🥰 kiss kiss kiss; 🥳 time to party; 🦚 peacock; 🧐 seems sus; 🛴 scoot scoot; 🆒 cool cool cool	**GIF of the Year**: **Thank u, next**; Don't @ me; Giiiiirllll; Happy Mamma Mia; I love you back; Let's go baby; Not in my house; Okurrrrr; Reggie Watts applause; Sashay away; Slide into his DM's girl; Surprise
**Instagram of the Year**: **#blackexcellence**; #HeidiHalloween; And forever starts now...; Blessings; Hairstyle designed with vibranium; Kylie + Stormi; Moonlit fog waves; No animals were harmed; The end of an incredible chapter; We got this; What about the pot?; What'd you guys do today?	**Meme of the Year**: **Is this a pigeon?**; American Chopper argument; By Age 35; Change my mind; Exit off ramp; Gym Kardashian; In my Feelings Challenge; Knickers the Steer; Really Start Dressin'; What The Fluff Challenge; Yanny vs. Laurel; Zendaya is Meechee

=== Creative & Media ===
**Best Animal**: **Tunameltsmyheart**; Bertie Bert the Pom; Jack the Cockatiel; Juniper & Fig; Loki the Wolfdog; Lucas the Spider; Ludwik Guinea Pig; Stella Max Pig; Suki Cat; Tinkerbelle the Dog; Walter Good Boy; Woof + Walls	**Best in Art**: **Shantell Martin**; Dante Dentoni; Felipe Pantone; Liana Finck; Ruby Silvious; Sha'an d'Anthes; Subliming.jpg; Tatsuya Tanaka; thelatestkate; Thomas Romain; Tyler Spangler; Yeah It's Chill
**Best in Beauty**: **Antonio Garza**; Cydnee Black; Destiny LaShae; Dian Pelangi; Ellarie Noel; Gothamista; iluvsarahii; Lewys Ball; Ling KT; Maye Musk; Samantha Ravndahl	**Best in Fashion**: **Carrie Dragshaw**; Halima Aden; Harling Ross; Jasmine Tookes; Jeremy Mitchell; Jillian Mercado; Kerwin Frost; Officially Quigley; Rocky Barnes; Salem Mitchell; SartoriallyInc; Slick Woods
**Best in Food**: **Alex French Guy Cooking**; Brad Leone; David Chang; Drinking with Chickens; Lauren Ko; Maangchi; Matty Matheson; Spoon Fork Bacon; Steve1989MREInfo; Strictly Dumpling; The Icing Artist; Yukiko Tanzi	**Best in Health & Wellness**: **Jay Shetty**; Bec Donlan; Demi Bagby; Dr. Joshua Wolrich; Dr. Rahim Gonstead Chiropractor; Heather Andersen; Jocko Willink; Kati Morton; Meg Boggs; Recipes for Self Love; The Lean Machine; Wendy Sue Swanson
**Best in House & Home**: **Marie Kondo**; Brian Patrick Flynn; Corey Damen Jenkins; Drew Scott @lonefoxhome; Hermione Chantal; Judy Aldridge @atlantishome; Justina Blakeney; Kim + Scott @yellowbrickhome; Nicole White @livelaughdecorate; Sarah Sherman Samuel; Sophie Hinchliffe; Terrible Floor Plans	**Best in Weird**: **Captain Disillusion**; @fashionsecrets93; 4d3d3d3 Engaged; Ballpoint Papi @Tw1tterPicasso; Bird Graveyard; Coffee Dad; Crimes Against Shoemanity; Grand Illusions; Mickey Avalon; SMG4; EbayBae; Tyler Adams Dawson @tyleradamsdawson
**Best Journalist**: **Ronan Farrow**; Al Bello; Charlotte Wilder; Elizabeth Weil; Emily Chang; Gayle King; Hannah Dreier; John Carreyrou; Kara Swisher; Lisa Ling; Matt Danzico; Rachel Nichols	**Best in Lifestyle**: **Molly Burke**; Brendan Fallis; Caitlin Covington; Kelsey Simone; Kurt Ji; Lexie Lombard; Marianna Hewitt; Remi Cruz; Rohini Elyse; Ryan Clark; Silver is the New Blonde; Tezza
**Best LGBTQ+ Account**: **Shangela**; Adam Eli; Ambers Closet; Chandler N Wilson; Chella Man; Desmond is Amazing; Gus Kenworthy; Jacob Tobia; Jessie Paege; Melanie Murphy; NOAHFINNCE; Stevie Boebi	**Best in Literature**: **Michelle Obama**; Angie Thomas; Celeste Ng; James S. Murray; Jason Reynolds; Jenny Han; Jensen Karp; Lauren Oliver; Mark Manson; Rupi Kaur; Tahereh Mafi; Tomi Adeyemi
**Best in Meme/Parody Account**: **@kalesalad**; @itsanimatedtext; @menotgivingafuck; @nihilist_arbys; @pixelatedboat; @renaissance__man; @sadtopographies; @seinfeld2000; @tank.sinatra; @teenagestepdad; @thesamepictureofchrispratt_; @uglydesign	**Best in Parenting/Family**: **JesssFam**; Amanda Auer; averageparentproblems; Beleaf in Fatherhood; father_of_daughters; Jamie and Nikki; Kids Eat in Color; KKandbabyJ; Life with Micah; Mel and Shane; th3littlestavenger; The Bafana Family
**Best in Sports**: **Aly Raisman**; Adam Rippon; David Ortiz; Joel Embiid; JuJu Smith-Schuster; Mo'ne Davis; Naomi Osaka; Pat McAfee; Saina Nehwal; Shaquem Griffin; Shawn Johnson East; Shib Sibs	**Best Web Series**: **This Might Get**; AM2DM; Cobra Kai; Good Mythical Morning; Hiking with Kevin; How It Should Have Ended; Like & Subscribe; Liza on Demand; Sideswiped; Sorry For Your Loss; The Burger Show
**Best in Games**: **K/DA – Pop/Stars**; Westworlds: The Maze; Celebrity Champion Challenges – Marvel Contest of Champions; Critical Role; The Call of Duty Alexa Skill; Xbox Game Pass Twitter Presence; Eve Online - Recruit Friends, Get Rewards; PUBG Mobile North American Launch; Sentinel of the Spaceways (Marvel Contest of Champions' 4-year Anniversary)

=== Team Internet ===
**Breakout YouTuber of the Year**: **Peter McKinnon**; Actually Happened; bestdressed; Denzel Dion; Doctor Mike; Haley Pham; Madelaine Petsch; Moriah Elizabeth; Subhi Taha; Summer McKeen; TechMe0ut; Will Smith	**YouTuber of the Year**: **Shane Dawson**; Andre "Black Nerd" Meadows; Colleen Ballinger; David Dobrik; DeStorm Power; Emma Chamberlain; Guava Juice; James Charles; Lauren Giraldo; Michelle Khare; Tana Mongeau; Zane Hijazi
**Instagrammer of the Year**: **@rickeythompson**; @andrewknapp; @beijing_silvermine; @garyjanetti; @gryffindior; @itsjojosiwa; @tinycactus; @thehungrygentleman; @olympiaohanian; @punk_history; @sarashakeel; @isteef	**Twitch Streamer of the Year**: **Ninja**; Adam Koebel; Becca; Cahlaflour; Castro_1021; ClassyKatie; Disguised Toast; Hafu; Sweet Anita; TSM_Daequan; xChocoBars; ZeRo
**Best YouTube Musician**: **Conan Gray**; AJ Rafael; Alex G; Dotan Negrin; Jared Dines; Lennon Stella; Max and Harvey; Next Town Down; Sophia Grace; Taylor Davis; Tyler Ward; VoicePlay	**Best YouTube Ensemble**: **The Try Guys**; Bright Sun Films; Brooklyn and Bailey; Cole&Sav; Familia Diamond; HellthyJunkFood; Jess and Gabriel; Merrell Twins; Sidemen; TFIL; Yes Theory; Sister Squad
**Tik-Toker of the Year**: **Nala Cat**; Ari Fararooy; Austin and Gabby; Awez Darbar; Billy Mann; Dominic Toliver; Drea Knows Best; Jesse La Flair; Kailey Maurer; Katja Glieson; LeeThe4th; Nathan Piland	**Vlogger of the Year**: **Ryland Adams**; Ami Yamato; Chris Chann; Ellie Thumann; Josh Peck; Erika Costell; Heath Hussar; Justin Escalona; MrBeast; Nicole Laeno; Olivia Jade; Sara Dietschy
**Best YouTube Comedian**: **MacDoesIt**; Evelyn from the Internets; Gus Johnson; Jarvis Johnson; Joana Ceddia; Kalen Allen; Karina Garcia; Mikaela Long; Morgz; Nick Antonyan; Rachel Ballinger; Tré Melvin	

=== Tech & Innovation ===
**Best in Activism**: **Mari Copeny**; Bernice A. King; Blair Imani; Brittany Packnett; Colin Kaepernick; Danny Glover; Jameela Jamil; Marley Dias; Michael Skolnik; Monica Lewinsky; Nyle DiMarco; Sonita Alizadeh	**Best in Education**: **Tristan Paredes**; Be Kind Rewind; Cody's Lab; Early EDventures; Five Foot One Teacher; Kaptain Kristian; Mark Rober; Parker Walbeck; Physics Girl; Sam O'Nella Academy; Stan Prokopenko; The Backyard Scientist
**Best in Gaming**: **GamingWithJen**; Chris Smoove; deligracy; GeeSice; GLITCHXCITY; KayKayEs; laurenzside; Logdotzip; Myth; Roanoke Gaming; Shesez; Valkyrae	**Best Podcast**: **Tiny Meat Gang**; Armchair Expert with Dax Shepard; Awards Chatter; Dr. Death; How I Built This with Guy Raz; Las Culturistas; The Last Podcast on the Left; My Favorite Murder; Now What? with Arian Foster; Pod Save the People; Slow Burn; Still Processing
**Best in Travel**: **@brandonmjordan**; @lostleblanc; @jamesrelfdyer; @onestep4ward; @hopscotchtheglobe; @spiritedpursuit; @marisahampe; @im_nicolemarie; @oneikatraveller; @rayawashere; Sailing La Vagabonde; @cupoftj	**Innovator of the Year**: **Lady Gaga**; Ava DuVernay; Bo Burnham; Brian Armstrong; Elon Musk; Emily Weiss; Karena Evans; Kendrick Lamar; Roberto Aguirre-Sacasa; Sara Blakely; Tristan Walker; Whitney Wolfe Herd

== Brand and Organization winners and nominees ==
Best in Branded Content: Rice Krispies Treats Love Notes; Can't Judge a Book; Can't Judge a Book (2); L.L.Bean Be an Outsider at Work; Love Has No Labels, Rising; Now That's A Cardiac	Best Branded Podcast: Rachel Maddow Presents: Bag Man, an MSNBC Podcast; Escape At Dannemora: Real Crime Profile Podcast Series; Audience Honor: Gold; UnErased: The History of Conversion Therapy in America; Silver; Breach: A Podcast by Carbonite Exploring Data Breaches & Cybersecurity; Exchanges at Goldman Sachs Podcast
Best Branded Series: AT&T Hello Lab Presents "Guilty Party; 4 Photographers Shoot The Same Model; DBS Sparks Mini-Series; Extreme I.T. series; Momsplaining Season 2; You Know That Scene Series	
