= Uoma Beauty =

US beauty company

- Industry: Beauty
- Founded: 2019
- Founder: Sharon Chuter
- Headquarters: Los Angeles, California
- Key people: Sharon Chuter (Founder)
- Owner: MacArthur Beauty LLC
- Website: uomabeauty.com

Uoma Beauty is an American beauty company founded by Nigerian-born Sharon Chuter. Headquartered in Los Angeles, the company focuses on inclusive beauty. In 2019, the company launched 108 products for the face, lips and eyes, including fifty-one shades of foundation in six custom formulas, at Ulta Beauty stores around the country.

== History ==
In late April 2019, Sharon Chuter launched a collection of 108 products with Uoma Beauty. Chuter moved the headquarters from London to Los Angeles.

Uoma was inspired by the Igbo word OMA, meaning beautiful. Sharon Chuter said, “The U in front is shortened from Umu – So it should be umu-oma which means beautiful people, but it’s such a long word and hard to brand so we went with UOMA...".

After an e-commerce launch, the brand appeared at ULTA Beauty and Selfridges after Chuter met representatives of the stores at a conference and via a friend respectively. During the Coronavirus pandemic in 2020, the company took part in the BeautyUnited campaign which focused on supporting front-line workers.

During the George Floyd protests in 2020, Chuter created an initiative called "Pull Up for Change" and coupled it with the hashtag #pulluporshutup on social media. The challenge was for other beauty brands to release the exact number of Black employees at their companies on the corporate and executive level, instead of just piggybacking off a trending hashtag. Since the challenge was released brands such as Kylie Cosmetics, ULTA, L'Oreal and Sephora have released demographic data on their employees and executives. The challenge has also ventured outside of the beauty industry, publishing lists from Facebook Google, Netflix, etc.

In May 2023, Sharon Chuter stepped down as CEO of Uoma Beauty and announced Cyndi Isgrig, former president of Dermstore, would serve as interim CEO. At the end of 2024, founder Sharon Chuter decided to step down as CEO.

== Lawsuit ==
In February 2025, Sharon Chuter, founder of Uoma Beauty, filed a lawsuit against MacArthur Beauty LLC and BrainTrust over the allegedly unauthorized and undervalued sale of the brand’s assets in December 2023. The lawsuit, filed in Los Angeles, claims fraudulent transfer and unjust enrichment. Chuter argues that the sale, made to cover a $6.2 million loan, was commercially unreasonable and far below Uoma’s previous valuation of up to $50 million.

== Collaborations ==
For the launch of the "Black Magical Carnival Collection", the company partnered Jackie Aina and Patrick Starrr to promote it.

== See also ==
- BITE Beauty
