= Cinda Boomershine =

American entrepreneur, designer and TV personality

- Born: June 4, 1972 (age 54); Atlanta, GA
- Education: Vanderbilt University (1994)
- Occupations: Creator and Founder of cinda b
- Spouse: Mark Boomershine (m. 1997)
- Website: www.cindab.com

Cinda Boomershine (born June 4, 1972) is an American entrepreneur, designer and TV personality. She rose to prominence for her appearances in the hit TBS show Movie and a Makeover and is best known as the creator and founder of cinda b, a line of travel bags, totes and accessories.

== Life and education ==
Boomershine was born in Atlanta, Georgia, on June 4, 1972. Her father, Ryland Koets, is an architect and skilled builder. Her mother, Elizabeth Koets, is a kitchen designer. She graduated from Westminster Schools in Atlanta and attended Vanderbilt University, where she was president of the residential student body and a member of the Delta Delta Delta sorority. She later received an MBA from Georgia State University.

== Career ==
Boomershine started her career as a press secretary for a congressional candidate. Following his win, she worked briefly in Washington, DC, before returning to Atlanta and taking a job at a local marketing and advertising firm.

In 2000, Boomershine, along with her husband, Mark Boomershine, opened an off-road adventure tour company in Highlands, Noeth Carolina, called Highlands Safari. In 2002, Boomershine opened an interior design firm. In 2003, a producer at TBS noticed Boomershine's work and hired her as an on-camera design expert on the channel's weekly show "Movie and a Makeover". For the next eight years (until the show ended), Boomershine appeared regularly, remaking everything from a laundry room to a vintage motor home. In 2007, Boomershine worked as a co-host with Vern Yip on HGTV's Deserving Design. In 2008, she joined HGTV's Decorating Cents as a guest designer.

With businesses in Atlanta and Highlands, North Carolina, Boomershine often lived out of her weekend bag. She searched for a functional replacement that was not overly expensive, but could not find one. She designed her own line of travel bags; the cinda b brand was born in late 2004. In 2013, Boomershine appeared as a guest on the Bloomberg Television show "Pimm Fox".

In 2022, Boomershine and her family started the Great Loop and finished in June 2023. They documented their journey on YouTube and then put their Ocean Alexander up for sale.

== Personal life ==
Boomershine is married to artist Mark Boomershine. They were high school sweethearts. Boomershine dealt with infertility early in her marriage, but now has two children. She and her husband have renovated and restored several homes. She currently resides in Los Angeles, CA.
