= Ami Yamato =

Japanese virtual vlogger

- Born: October 26, 1995 (age 31)
- Occupations: Animator, VFX artist, VTuber

YouTube information
- Channel: Ami Yamato
- Years active: 2011–present
- Genres: Animation, VFX, Vlogging, Comedy, Travel
- Subscribers: 144 thousand
- Views: 9.61 million
- Last updated: September 10, 2026
- Website: amiyamato.com

Ami Yamato is a Japanese virtual vlogger. In her videos, she makes vlogs from the perspective of a 3D-animated character who does not seem to realize that she is animated. She is based in London, England, having originally moved there from Japan in the spring of 2011. Her videos deal with topics like her love of Starbucks and her light-hearted perspective on the world. She has produced a series of parodies called "Mash-Ins" where she edits herself into popular movies and TV shows, changing the narrative with a comical twist.

Yamato has collaborated with other YouTubers such as Captain Disillusion on a Back to the Future-themed video, Natalie Tran (Community Channel), Jaiden Animations, Lily Hevesh, LetMeExplain Studios, PewDiePie, Marzia Kjellberg, Domics, Thomas Ridgewell (TomSka), Shutter Authority, and Sneaky Zebra. She was nominated for the "Vlogger of the Year" award at the 11th Shorty Awards.

In 2019, Yamato was featured in an episode of BBC Click about virtual YouTubers.
