= Openfilm =

Former indie film distributor

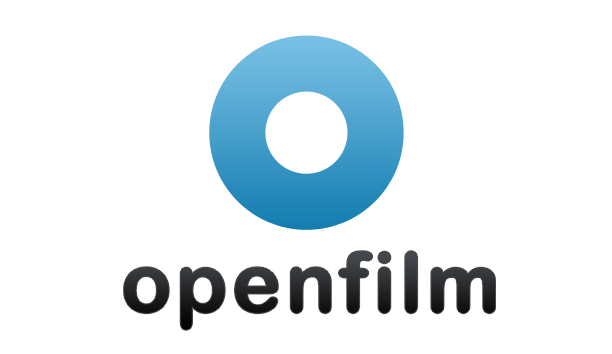
- Company type: Public
- Website type: Video sharing
- Available in: 5 languages (En, Es, De, Fr, It)
- Founded: November 2007
- Headquarters: North Miami, Florida, U.S.
- Key people: James Caan Co-Founder & Chairman; Dmitry Kozko, Co-Founder & CEO; Alan Melikdjanian, Co-Founder & Chief Creative Officer
- Website: www.openfilm.com (Offline)
- Registration: Optional (required to upload, comment and rate videos)
- Launched: July 22, 2008 / June 5, 2008
- Current status: Inactive

Openfilm was a website for finding and distributing independent film. Its advisory board included members of the film industry, such as James Caan, Robert Duvall, Scott Caan and Mark Rydell, and independent filmmaker Alan Melikdjanian.

The site was named "Best Online Video Sharing Site" by Videomaker Magazine in their 2008 "Best Products of the Year" feature.

Openfilm closed in August 2015.
