= Subhi Taha =

Palestinian-Filipino content creator

- Occupations: fashion designer, content creator

Instagram information
- Pages: Sbeih.jpg; Backup account
- Years active: Until 2025
- Followers: 1.6 million (03 Aug 2024)

TikTok information
- Page: @Subhi.AlBiddawy
- Followers: 858.7 thousand

X information
- Handle: @SubhiAlBiddawy
- Display name: Subhi صبحي
- Followers: 120.2 thousand

YouTube information
- Channel: @Subhi.AlBiddawy
- Subscribers: 270 thousand
- Last updated: 31 Jul 2026

Subhi Taha, formerly known as Sbeih.jpg on Instagram, is a Palestinian-Filipino-American fashion designer and content creator. He gained attention for his content about being Muslim and Arab American. His YouTube channel was nominated for a 2019 Shorty Award in the Breakout YouTuber category. His Instagram account @sbeih.jpg contained pro-Palestine content and had 1.6 million followers on August 3, 2024. Meta, the owner of Instagram, disabled the account in March 2025.

== Biography ==
Taha is a Palestinian and Filipino Muslim from Dallas, Texas. A fashion designer, he released a line of unisex, modest clothing.

Additionally, he is a content creator. He gained attention with his videos about being Muslim and Arab American. In one TikTok video called "When your Arabic is mostly conversational & religious", he pretends to be interviewed for an Arabic-speaking flight attendant job and is asked to make an in-flight announcement. He uses a mix of Muslim religious phrases, Arabic body language, Palestinian dialect, emojis, and English subtitles to parody a second-generation immigrant's Arabic language skills. Scholar Francesco L. Sinatora analyzed the video as an example of using comedy and multiple languages to promote Arab-American identity and challenge "post–September 11 discourse of marginalization grounded in English monolingualism". In another TikTok, he spoke about the thick, warm "immigrant blankets" popular in Arab culture. By July 2025, he had 829,000 TikTok followers.

In 2017 and 2018, Taha was selected for the YouTube Creators for Change initiative, which provided logistical and financial support for creators to make videos advocating for social causes. For the program, he created "Thread of Connection: A Palestinian Story", a video about his family friends who are Palestinian refugees. Taha's video "Just Say It", urging his viewers to advocate for social change, was called "effective" and "beautifully composed". In 2019, his YouTube channel was nominated for a Shorty Award in the Breakout YouTuber category. His YouTube channel was captioned: "just an average Muslim-American". By 2021, he had 250,000 subscribers.

=== Instagram ===
Taha's now-suspended Instagram account, @sbeih.jpg, featured video posts that were typically about 2 minutes long in English with occasional Arabic words. His account promoted Palestinian culture and identity with imagery like keffiyehs, dabke dancers, and Palestinian flags. One post with 29,000 likes showed him at the Dome of the Rock with the caption "ya’ll … i [sic] made it home." He also posted about Palestinian history and current events, utilizing hashtags like #istandwithpalestine and asking his followers to participate in pro-Palestine activism. According to scholar Sema Üstün Külünk, Taha's translation of Arabic-language content made Palestinian culture and narratives more accessible to a non-Palestinian audience. From Taha's Instagram account he linked to his website called Palestine Academy with further information about Palestinian history and culture.

Taha made posts stating that Israel is a settler colonial state attempting to ethnically cleanse Palestinians from their indigenous land. After the October 7 attacks, Taha made a post arguing that Palestinians have the right to resist the Israeli occupation and that anyone who disagrees is a "colonizer". It was viewed 12.3 million times and shared 81.2 thousand times. Israeli journalist Shir Reuven criticized the post as "woke" and setting up a false dichotomy between Palestinians and Israelis. Scholar Zainab Saeed El-Mansi wrote that Sbeih.jpg is continuing "the Palestinian anti-colonial struggle across colonial borders" and challenging "the hegemonic Western and Zionist colonial digital and media narratives." El-Mansi identified Sbeih.jpg as part of the post-2010 generation of Palestinians which Raja Khalidi called a "younger, radical, and impatient generation". Posts from Taha were included as evidence in a University of Essex investigation of several students associated with the Palestine Solidarity Society.

As of November 2023, @sbeih.jpg had 1.6 million followers. A 2024 paper about the impact of social media on political discourse identified the account as a "Top Opinion Leader" on Instagram. The account was banned by Meta in March 2025.

== Awards and nominations ==
Year	Awards	Category	Result	Ref.
2019	Shorty Awards	Breakout YouTuber	Nominated	
