= Peter McKinnon =

Canadian photographer and YouTuber

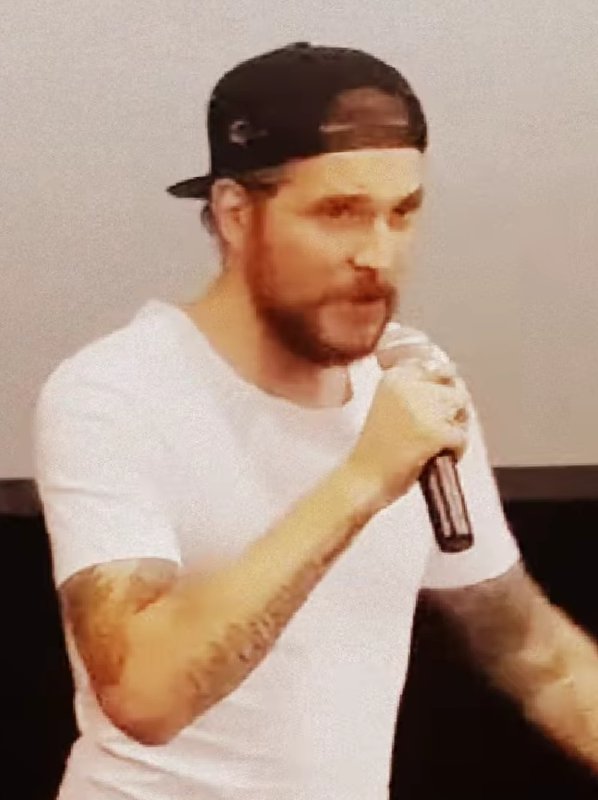
- McKinnon in 2017
- Born: Peter McKinnon; October 28, 1985 (age 40); Toronto, Canada
- Years active: 2016–present

Instagram information
- Page: Peter McKinnon
- Followers: 3.1 million

YouTube information
- Channel: Peter McKinnon
- Genres: Photography; film; vlog
- Subscribers: 6.03 million
- Views: 657.1 million
- Last updated: September 16, 2026
- Website: www.petermckinnon.com

Peter McKinnon (born October 28, 1985) is a Canadian photographer, filmmaker, and YouTuber. He is known for his tutorials that he posts online, which he began making due to a lack of high-quality and engaging ones that he had found. McKinnon has also released camera equipment and merchandise in collaboration with established brands.

== Early life ==
Peter McKinnon was born on October 28, 1985, in Toronto, Canada. He originally grew up as a BMX biker and skateboarder.

== Career ==
McKinnon was not interested in photography until he was gifted a point-and-shoot camera in c. 2009 for attending his sister's wedding party. McKinnon then saved up for a DSLR after seeing his friend use one; he later began shooting weddings, portraits, and stock photos. He dropped out of college after being one credit short of graduating and worked a series of jobs while training to be a magician, including a golf course landscaper, State Farm associate, and steakhouse cook. McKinnon began uploading to YouTube in 2016 while working at a camera shop. He started making videos due to the lack of engaging and high-quality filmmaking videos the he had seen. He switched to working on the channel full-time when he had 800 subscribers.

In 2019, the Royal Canadian Mint announced that a photo of Moraine Lake taken by McKinnon would feature on a 2 oz (57 g) fine silver coin, with the edges of the coin being graved in the shape of a camera's aperture. That year, he also worked with PolarPro to create neutral-density filters. In 2020, he collaborated with Nomatic, releasing a camera backpack; it was nominated for Best Creator Product at the 10th Streamy Awards. Also in 2020, McKinnon was chosen by Canon Inc. to introduce the Canon EOS R5 in the camera's official announcement video. He released additional camera bags with Nomatic in 2023, funding the product through Kickstarter. In 2025, McKinnon released a limited-edition Insta360 X4 camera with Insta360.

== Awards and nominations ==
Year	Award	Category	Result	Ref.
2019	Shorty Awards	Breakout YouTuber of the Year	Won	
2019	Streamy Awards	Cinematography	Nominated	
2020	Streamy Awards	Cinematography	Won	
2020	Streamy Awards	Creator Product	Nominated	
