= Chris Smoove =

American YouTuber

- Occupation: YouTuber

YouTube information
- Channel: Chris Smoove
- Years active: 2006–present
- Genres: Gaming; sports
- Subscribers: 5.08 million
- Views: 3.72 billion
- Last updated: March 15, 2025

Chris Smoove is an American YouTuber, known for his NBA 2K video content. On YouTube, he is a pioneer of gameplay and commentary videos, particularly for the NBA 2K series of which he is widely considered as one of, if not the most popular content creator.

== YouTube career ==
From South Florida, Smoove is best known for his YouTube videos, having joined the platform in 2006, originally under the name "Smoove7182954". He later changed his YouTube name to "Chris Smoove". In February 2008, he uploaded his first video–a short clip of a spin and jump move in NBA 2K. Though he has also uploaded Call of Duty, FIFA, and Watch Dogs videos, he gained most of his following through NBA 2K videos. The 2K game series introduced its "MyCareer" mode in NBA 2K10; a community of players creating videos revolving around their MyCareer play-throughs ensued. Smoove was an early creator in the NBA 2K community on YouTube, becoming one of the genre's biggest. Writing for Bleacher Report, Brian Mazique described Smoove as "a simulation style gamer that runs set plays, and brings a solid blend of real basketball knowledge and an understanding of how that should be translated in a video game". Mazique also noted that fans of Smoove's recognize him for his voice. Regarding his commentary style, he has been noted for his "splash" catchphrase and the inclusion of auto-tune to modulate his vocal delivery. In addition to NBA 2K videos, Smoove also uploads real-life National Basketball Association (NBA) news updates.

The series' developer, 2K Sports, has recognized Smoove's presence in the scene. He was among several creators invited by the developer to their headquarters to take suggestions on an early build of NBA 2K13. For the 2K15 installment, 2K Sports introduced a face-scanning technology for players to insert their faces onto their in-game players. The developer invited Smoove to their studios to scan his face and use his likeness in the career mode's opening cinema scene. 2K Sports included Smoove's likeness once again in a trailer for their "Neighborhood" mode in NBA 2K19. Smoove has played against professional athletes in his videos such as David Ortiz, Tony Parker, and John Wall. Smoove is a partner with BBTV through "NBA Playmakers", a basketball culture video network which was launched in 2016.

Smoove has also criticized the 2K series' more recent iterations, such as 2K23 and 2K24. Regarding 2K24, he was particularly critical of the game's paid season pass and badge regression system, calling the former a "scumbag move", and saying the latter "felt like checking into a work shift". His criticism of the badge regression system in the latter amplified community discussion on the issue, prompting a response from 2K Sports producer Zach Timmerman, who stated, "it was inevitable there would be some initial growing pains with the new badge system in MyCareer, but as time goes things will be adjusted as needed. Just know we're listening, hearing feedback."

=== Viewership and accolades ===
Smoove's YouTube videos have become prominent in the 2K scene on the platform, propelling him to become a figurehead for content relating to the series' MyCareer mode in particular. By the release of 2K13, Smoove had amassed over 700,000 subscribers on YouTube. By NBA 2K15's release, he had just under 1.9 million subscribers. In 2018, Smoove surpassed the 2 billion views milestone and reached over 4 million subscribers by July. As of 2025, Smoove's channel has earned over 5 million subscribers.

At the 11th Shorty Awards in 2019, Smoove was nominated in the "Gaming" category.
