= Tim Rowett =

British toy collector and YouTuber (born 1942)

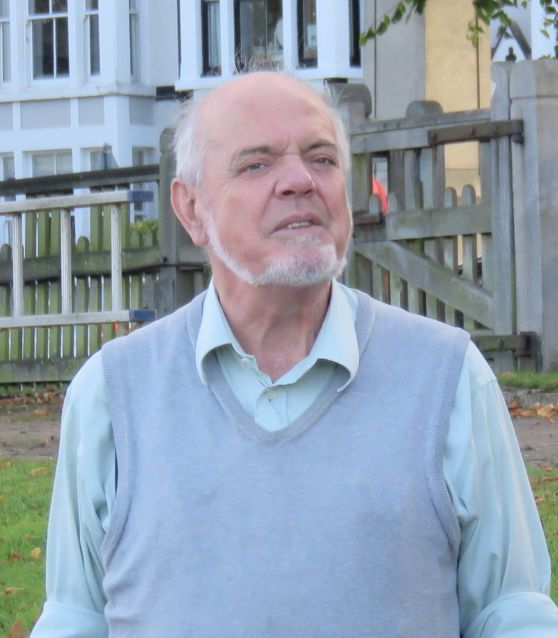
- Rowett in 2015
- Born: Timothy Quiller Rowett; 12 July 1942 (age 84); Surrey, England
- Occupations: Video presenter; toy collector; writer

YouTube information
- Channel: Grand Illusions
- Years active: 2008–present
- Subscribers: 2.11 million
- Views: 609 million
- Last updated: 3 September 2026
- Website: www.grand-illusions.com

Timothy Quiller Rowett (born 12 July 1942) is a British YouTube personality and renowned toy collector, known for presenting videos about toys, optical illusions, novelties and puzzles on the YouTube channel Grand Illusions. Rowett, known affectionately as "Tim the Toyman", is a former children's entertainer, and claims to have collected upwards of 20,000 to 25,000 toys over a 50-year period, many of which are featured in his videos.

In 2014, the Daily Mirror described Rowett as a "huge viral hit" and a "web sensation", while in the following year The Daily Telegraph published a piece naming him as one of "the best YouTubers over 50".

== Career ==
Rowett worked as an entertainer at children's parties from his late 20s until retiring in 2007 when he was 65. He also formerly worked at British Telecom, and has a degree in Mechanical Engineering gained in the early 1960's from King's College London.

In a short BBC documentary, Rowett said that he considered the toys in his suitcases "dead" because they were no longer used, and that he took "great delight" in being able to bring them out and show them to people through his YouTube videos. In the past he has also donated some of his old toys to children's hospitals.

=== Grand Illusions ===
Rowett initially wrote about all the toys in his collection in a magazine called 'Tim's Toy Reports'. Starting 1998 he started making videos of the toys. Initially they were only available on a CD-ROM, titled 'Tim's Wonderful Toys', which could be purchased using details on the Grand Illusions website. Since 2008, Rowett has presented videos on the YouTube channel Grand Illusions. In each video, he demonstrates and reacts to at least one toy, puzzle, or optical illusion normally part of his collection or occasionally will also be stocked through an online toy store, run as part of the Grand Illusions brand (to which he is a director). There are now over a thousand videos on the channel which are around 10 minutes in length each, and have collectively been viewed hundreds of millions of times. The channel surpassed one million subscribers in June 2019. Since then the number of subscribers has risen to over two million.

Grand Illusions was started as an online community for science and puzzles in 1996. It was developed by Hendrik Ball and George Auckland (then BBC producers) who were exploring the role of the media and the World Wide Web during the late 90s. Rowett became involved early on due to his large toy collection, and is a personal friend of Auckland and Ball. Grand Illusions became an online store for toys and novelties in 1998, stocking hard-to-source pieces. Since the success of the Grand Illusions YouTube channel, and the attention it has received on websites like Reddit, the store has commissioned new toys and also stocks unique items that are handmade or produced in small quantities.

The videos for Grand Illusions are filmed in a 17th-century farm house in rural Oxfordshire, and developed by Ball and Auckland (both since long retired from the BBC). Since 2013, most of the intro and outro sequences for the videos have been designed by David Chaudoir, with music composed by Pete Diggens (of The Aurophonic Workshop). The Grand Illusions online store is run from Oxfordshire although the items are now sent out by a fulfilment house in Newbury.

=== Other work ===
Rowett appeared on the television science programme Take Nobody’s Word For It in 1989 alongside Carol Vorderman, demonstrating optical illusions.

Rowett has been cited and thanked in a number of books as a toy collector and consultant. Rowett has also contributed his own writing and poetry to books in the past, first publishing a piece in the 1999 edition of The Mathemagician and Pied Puzzler: a Collection in Tribute to Martin Gardner, and again in 2001 with a piece in Puzzlers' Tribute: A Feast for the Mind.

== Personal life ==
Rowett lives by himself at his Twickenham home in England, and claims to have not owned a television or computer since the 1970s (however in January 2017 he acquired a model Televisor for his collection). He has been described as an "eccentric" and "quirky" collector and first became interested in toys while attending boarding school as a child, allegedly when a matron showed him a catalogue featuring a variety of toys. Aside from this, he also has an interest in engineering and mechanics.

In a 2014 interview with Wired UK, Rowett reflected on his age, stating "I see myself as an hourglass. A large part of me is 112, a small part is my physical age and the last part is a 12-year-old boy."

Rowett claimed that his home was burgled sometime around the 1980s, but the toy collection was untouched, leaving him feeling "obviously relieved" but "offended they hadn’t valued the toys enough to pinch them".

=== Toy collection ===
Among Rowett's first toys as a child included a novelty wheelbarrow and a squeaking panda teddy bear.

Journalists who visited Rowett's home noted that his collection, which spans over 50 years and contains an estimated 25,000 pieces, takes up a large amount of space. It was reported there were over 180 suitcases which are neatly ordered by year, and most of his walls and bookshelves are filled with items, including novelty clocks and display cabinets with optical illusions. Rowett has made appearances at toy conferences to demonstrate his collection, including at Play Creators Conference 2023.

Hendrik Ball, a former BBC producer who works with Rowett to develop the Grand Illusions videos, said that Rowett will carry around toys and equipment with him and give demonstrations "whenever there is a lull". After a meal at a restaurant, he allegedly went outside and inflated a large balloon using a helium cylinder stored in the boot of his car, then lit and attached a sparkler before releasing it into the air.

=== Family ===
Rowett was born during World War II to father William Berkeley Rowett, a regular British Army officer who after retirement from the army in 1962 became an ordained priest, and mother Elizabeth Chidell, who were married on 9 October 1934. He has four brothers. Rowett has distant relatives in Canada, and his family tree has immediate connections to the country. Through his father, he descends from cryptogamist Miles Joseph Berkeley, politician Rowland Berkeley and painter Emeric Essex Vidal.

In 1968, his elder brother David, who had moved to Canada, died at the age of 27.

== Awards ==
Year	Award	Category	Result	Ref.
2019	11th Shorty Awards	Best in Weird	Nominated	
