= Mark Boomershine =

American painter

- Born: September 20, 1971 (age 54); Atlanta, Georgia, United States
- Education: University of Alabama
- Website: markboomershine.com

Mark Boomershine (born 1971) is an American contemporary fine art painter with a strong interest in "iconic persona" and media of the 1970s and 1980s. Boomershine has artwork displayed in numerous galleries with the most recent being Legends, LaCienega Design District, 2016, Los Angeles, California and Solo Exhibit, Douglas Elliman, 2016, Beverly Hills, California. He is represented by the Voltz Clarke Gallery in New York City.

== Biography ==
Mark Boomershine was born in Atlanta, Georgia in 1971. After graduating from Westminster School in Atlanta, he attended the University of Alabama where he used both the left and right side of his brain by studying both Fine Art and Business Management. Boomershine graduated in 1995 with a business degree and a major in studio art.

== Career ==
Boomershine along with his wife Cinda Boomershine created an off-road adventure tour company in Highlands, North Carolina, called Highland Safari. Eventually they sold Highland Safari and went on to create an automotive safety product. Boomershine has had his work displayed in numerous galleries such as his exhibit "Revealed: Faces of our Time" which was displayed in the Surrey Hotel in New York City (2015). Boomershine's work has been published in numerous magazines as well such as Town & Country, Harper's Bazaar, The Atlantan, and many more.

== Personal life ==
Boomershine is married to American entrepreneur, designer and TV personality, Cinda Boomershine. They both went to Westminster School in Atlanta, where they were high school sweethearts. Together they have renovated and restored several homes. The Bommershine's Atlanta home has been featured in several articles and magazines. After a long struggle to have children, they now have a daughter (a and a son. In 2015, they moved across the country from Atlanta to Los Angeles, California. Boomershine's works from that period represent the lifestyle and energy that are emitted from living in Southern California. In 2022, the Boomershines began living full time on their 56 foot boat to travel around The Loop.
