= Brian Patrick Flynn =

American interior designer

Brian Patrick Flynn (born April 27, 1976 in Fort Lauderdale, Florida) is an American TV personality and interior design expert, whose on-camera career began on the TBS hit series Movie & a Makeover. He's best known for his work on the home giveaway franchises HGTV Dream Home and HGTV Urban Oasis for which he has been designing since June 2015.

== Career ==
Brian entered the television industry in 2002 at an NBC affiliate in Fort Lauderdale as a news producer. After producing a financial story on budget-friendly interior design projects, Brian crossed over from network to cable to join the production team of Surprise by Design on The Discovery Channel. The eight-hour makeover timeline prepared Brian for a similar position on the spin-off series Rally Round the House for which he relocated to Atlanta. It was there that Brian learned the art of designing outdoor living spaces and working with outdoor materials. Flynn is self-taught and credits his formal education in video production from The Art Institute of Fort Lauderdale for influencing his interest in set design and set decoration.

Following cancellation of Rally Round the House in 2003, Brian transitioned to work in front of the camera as a design expert on Movie & a Makeover. The fashion and home makeover program tasked Brian with designing spaces such as dorm rooms, laundry rooms, garden sheds, fraternity houses, non-profit board rooms, pet-care centers and outdoor living spaces. In addition to Movie & a Makeover, Brian was also a featured "redesigner" on the HGTV series Decorating Cents and served as design producer for two seasons of HGTV's reality competitionDesign Star.

Flynn's spaces are best described as soft-masculine and characterized by a unique mix of design styles, modern and classic art, unconventional color schemes and practical budgets. The designer's own country home in the Blue Ridge Mountains was featured in the October 2014 issue of Country Living magazine and continues to be a favorite for design lovers everywhere. His other notable projects include the design and decoration of The Walking Dead actress Lauren Cohan's Atlanta home; meteorologist and news anchor Rob Marciano's Atlanta loft and Los Angeles office; and two of HGTV's digital franchises, Holiday House and Spring House, on hgtv.com.

The designer primarily resides in Atlanta but frequently retreats his two alternate residences, the country home in the mountains of north Georgia and a Scandinavian pied-á-terre in Reykjavik, Iceland for creative inspiration.
