= Jackie Aina =

Nigerian American YouTuber (born 1987)

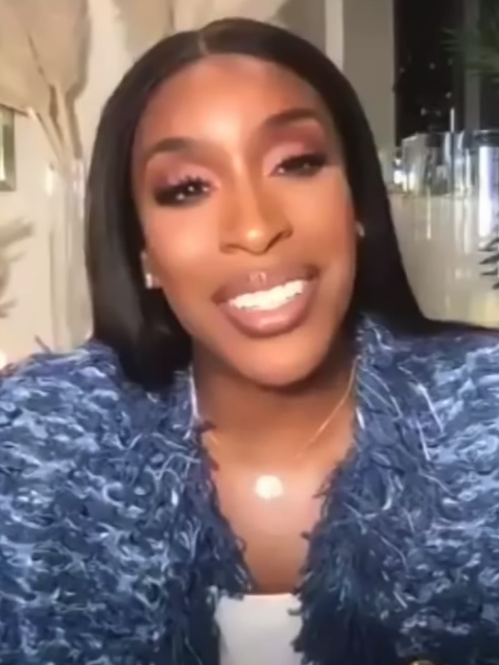
- Aina in 2021
- Born: Jacquelyn Lonje Olayiwola Oyeshola Bolayemi Aina; August 4, 1987 (age 39); Los Angeles, California, U.S.
- Occupation: Make-up artist

YouTube information
- Channel: Jackie Aina
- Years active: 2009–present
- Genres: Fashion; beauty
- Subscribers: 3.4 million
- Views: 433 million
- Last updated: September 9, 2026
- Website: jackieaina.com

Jacquelyn Lonje Olayiwola Oyeshola Bolayemi Aina (born August 4, 1987) is an American beauty YouTuber. She was born to an African-American mother and a Nigerian father of Yoruba descent. She is a YouTuber and social influencer known for advocating for the visibility of people of color in the cosmetic industry. She has partnered with Anastasia Beverly Hills, e.l.f. Cosmetics, Too Faced, Sephora and Sigma Beauty.

== Early career ==
After two years of college, Aina joined the United States Army Reserve. Aina launched her YouTube channel one year after joining the military. Her YouTube videos were a way of expressing herself and coping with her unhappy marriage at the time. She later divorced. While she was stationed in Hawaii, she was hired by MAC Cosmetics. According to Entrepreneur, Aina was repeatedly told at makeup counters in cosmetic stores that "the trends she wanted to try wouldn't work for her complexion." Subsequently, she started creating videos "about the products and looks she loved that could work for anyone."

== Advocacy ==
Aina argues that people of color are poorly represented and often ignored in the beauty industry, and has criticized makeup shade ranges for not being inclusive of darker skin tones. She has pointed out the lack of darker shade ranges for foundations within lines. She told Bustle in 2018: "We all come from so many different backgrounds, and we also come in different shades and varieties, and what may be something that I'd be willing to overlook may not be the case for someone else." In addition to foundation shades, Aina has said that eye shadow, blush, and lipstick colors are not universal for skin tones.

While Aina's criticism of cosmetics companies has compromised her relationship with several brands, she asserts that her intention is never to disparage the companies.

Aina has disapproved of people who claim that they "don't see color," saying that they ignore racial issues and discourage her from discussing them. In a YouTube video demonstration, she did an ordinary makeup tutorial in black and white, and subsequently revealed that she had put on makeup of the wrong color.

After IT Cosmetics co-founder and CEO Jamie Kern Lima criticized the beauty industry for non-inclusive and unrealistic depictions of women in advertising, Aina, who had previously criticized IT Cosmetics, confronted her and the rest of the industry about excluding people of color and accepting critiques from a white woman.

== Collaborations ==
In July 2016, Aina teamed up with e.l.f. Cosmetics to create an eye shadow palette.

In March 2017, Sigma Beauty released a set of five brushes created by Aina.

In December 2017, Aina announced the launch of two cosmetic powder highlighters, La Bronze and La Peach, in collaboration with cosmetic brand Artist Couture.

After Aina expressed her opinion that a foundation product by cosmetics brand Too Faced did not feature enough shades, Too Faced announced a collaboration with her to expand the shade range of its Born This Way foundation. By June 2018, the shade range had been expanded from 24 to 35 shades. Nine of the eleven new shades were formulated by Aina. Aina explained that she listened to perspectives of her online followers and other influencers of color when developing the product. Aina has said that the brand had reached out to her in efforts to diversify their products long before she had such a large online following.

Aina told Bustle in 2018 that she would create a cosmetics line by 2019.

In August 2019, Aina released an eyeshadow palette in collaboration with cosmetic brand Anastasia Beverly Hills. On the included shades, Aina said, "the palette is for everyone but my priority was making sure I chose shades that would specifically work for dark and deep-dark complexions."

== Awards and nominations ==
Year	Organization	Award	Nominated work	Result	Ref.
2018	NAACP Image Awards	YouTuber of the Year	Herself	Won	
2019	Streamy Awards	Beauty	Herself	Nominated	
2020	Streamy Awards	Beauty	Herself	Nominated	
2020	Streamy Awards	Collaboration	Naomi Campbell Gets Glam with Me!!! (with Naomi Campbell)	Nominated	
2026	NAACP Image Awards	Outstanding Digital Content Creator – Fashion/Beauty	Herself	Nominated	

== See also ==
- List of Yoruba people
