= Cody Reeder =

American educator, scientist, mechanic, and YouTube personality (born 1992)

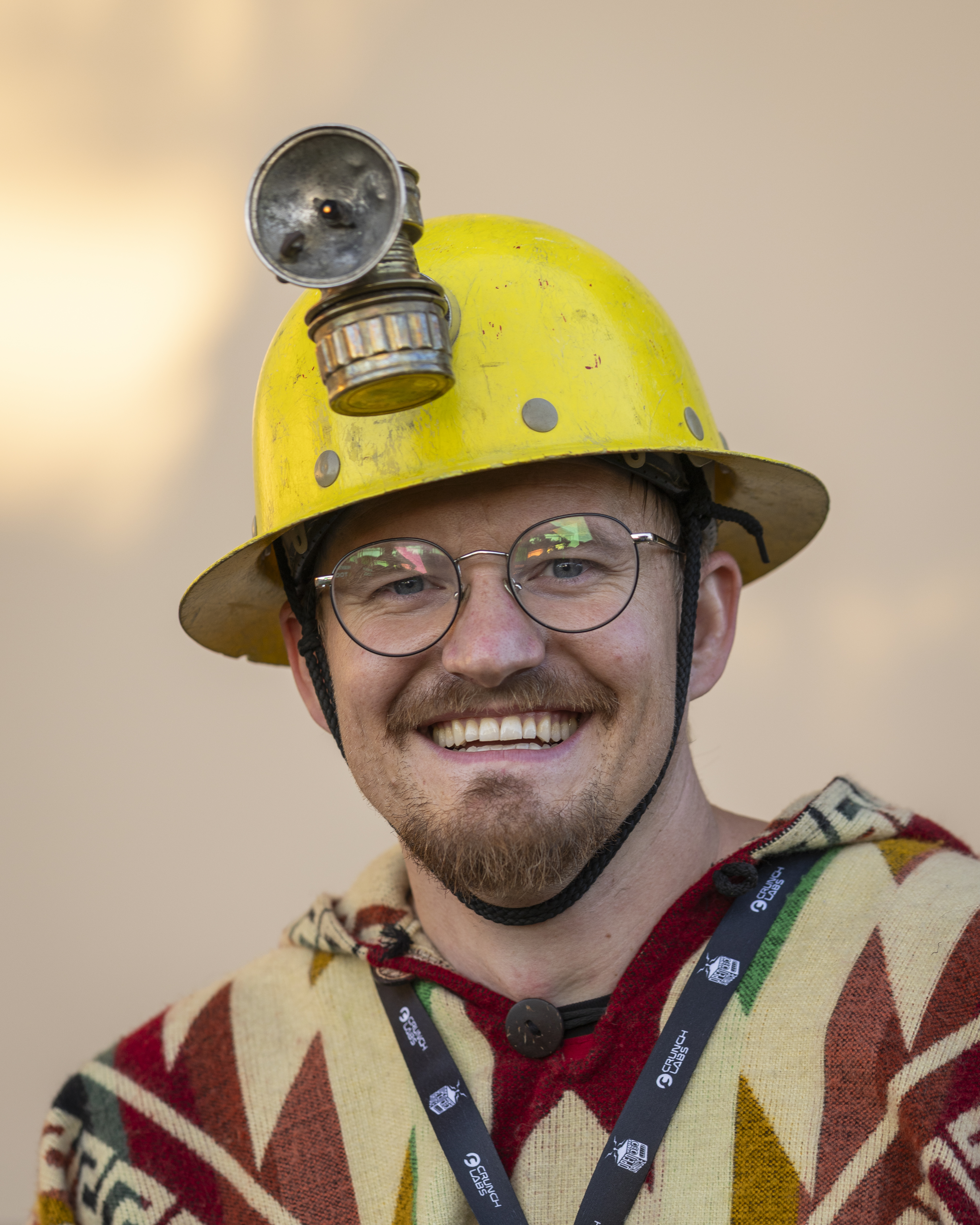
- Cody Reeder in 2026
- Born: 1992; Utah, United States
- Occupations: YouTube personality; mechanic

YouTube information
- Channel: Cody'sLab
- Years active: 2011–present
- Genres: Science; educational; vlog
- Subscribers: 2.22 million
- Views: 379 million
- Last updated: 17 August 2026

Cody Reeder is an American educator, amateur scientist, mechanic and YouTube personality. He runs the popular YouTube channel Cody'sLab.

== Life ==
Reeder was born and raised near Grantsville, Utah, on "an off grid ranch in the west desert".

He has worked as a mechanic, and studied geology at Westminster College and Utah State University, but was later academically suspended due to a low GPA.

== Experiments ==
Having joined YouTube in 2011, Reeder initially began posting videos of his experiments to show to his grandmother: "I would do science experiments all the time anyway ... Then other people started watching them", he explained in a 2017 interview.

His channel Cody'sLab reached 100,000 subscribers in October 2015. Having not received his silver play button six months later, Reeder celebrated reaching 250,000 subscribers by forging a homemade play button out of genuine silver. He reached 1,000,000 subscribers in early 2017.

Reeder first gained considerable media attention in 2016, after posting a video of himself drinking water containing a small, diluted amount of cyanide. The purpose was to prove how the dosage defines toxicity. While emphasizing that the amount he consumed (17 mg) was considerably smaller than any lethal dose, Reeder said he did experience certain symptoms of the toxin such as rapid breathing. This video, among others, has since been removed from his channel. Similar experiments however, such as him drinking heavy water, "hydric acid" (tongue-in-cheek), and breathing in all the noble gases, remain available as of August 2026.

In 2017, his channel was suspended for two weeks, following received strikes. The reason was suspected to be a video on the science behind how small insects (Reeder used fruit flies, of unspecified species) can survive being microwaved, while larger ones cannot. Preceding the suspension, an increase in flagged videos and concern that his account may be deactivated, prompted Reeder to create a back-up channel Which is now unavailable (12 September 2026). An article on TubeFilter blamed "overzealous viewers" for generating the automatic strikes, writing that Reeder's channel is both "wholesome and family-friendly", and commenting on how YouTube's strike system also affects those "who stay well within the bounds of acceptable content".

In a 2019 video explaining a period of channel inactivity, Reeder mentioned how some of his videos, although intended to be used for educational purposes, had been flagged by YouTube, showing a warning he received for a video on making gunpowder from urine. In the same video, Reeder explained how he also had been visited by United States government agents, after publishing several videos on isotope isolation and nuclear radiation. The agents, equipped with geiger counters, did not find anything of concern, and Reeder himself said that they were only trying to help him not get in trouble in the future.

He has also received media attention after becoming one of the 100 finalists of the defunct Mars One Mars colonization program, having been selected from over 200,000 applicants.
