= Captain Disillusion =

Latvian–American filmmaker (born 1980)

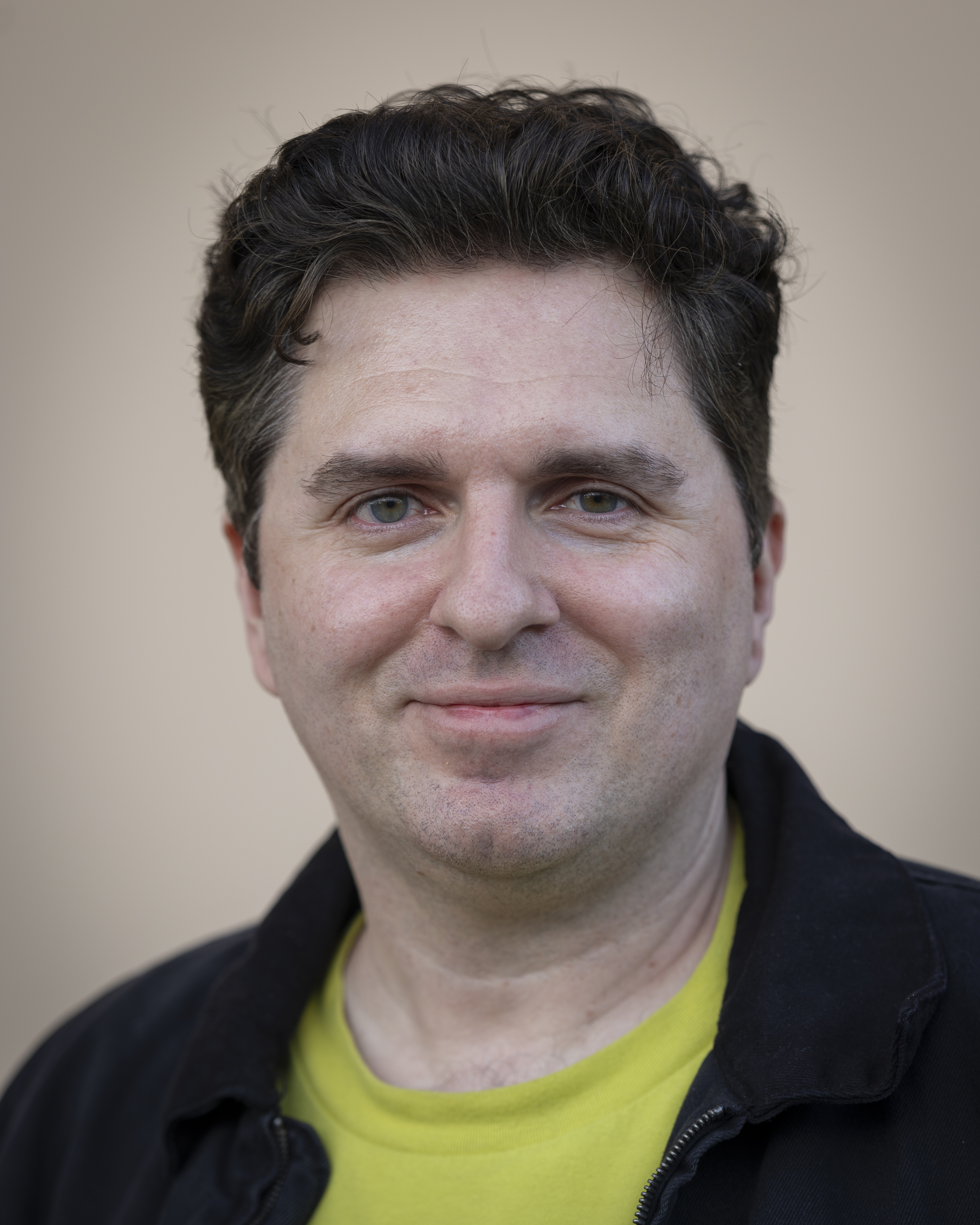
- Melikdjanian in 2026
- Born: Alan Melikdjanian; April 13, 1980 (age 46); Riga, Latvian SSR, Soviet Union
- Occupations: Filmmaker; YouTuber
- Years active: 2007–present

YouTube information
- Channel: CaptainDisillusion
- Genres: Visual effects; comedy; education
- Subscribers: 2.51 million
- Views: 280 million
- Captain Disillusion's voice Recorded October 2016
- Last updated: October 7, 2026
- Website: amelik.com

Alan Melikdjanian (/ˌmɛlɪkˈdʒeɪniən/; Armenian: Ալան Մելիքջանյան; Russian: Алан Меликджанян; born April 13, 1980), known by the alias Captain Disillusion, is a Latvian-born American independent filmmaker and YouTuber. Melikdjanian was active in the founding of video-sharing sites Openfilm and Filmnet.com, and is the creator of the webseries Captain Disillusion, which focuses on critical analysis of visual effects and video editing while promoting critical thinking and skepticism.

== Early life ==
Melikdjanian was born to Soviet-era circus performer parents of Armenian and Russian descent. His father, Vilen, was a well-known performer. Alan toured the Soviet Union with his parents until he was six years old, after which he lived with his grandmother while attending school. During the summer, he would resume touring with his parents. In his youth, Melikdjanian spent most of his free time trying to copy the styles of Disney animators.

His parents emigrated during the collapse of the USSR to the United States; he joined them two years later, attending the William H. Turner Technical Arts High School in Miami, where he studied video production and 3D animation. He graduated from the International Fine Arts College with a Bachelor of Fine Arts degree in film production.

== Career ==
=== FilmNet.com and Openfilm ===
Melikdjanian co-founded FilmNet.com as a creative director, and co-founded Openfilm as chief creative officer. Both were intended as alternatives to popular video-sharing site YouTube, but for serious amateur filmmakers who "don't want to place their work alongside YouTube's mediocrities." Openfilm closed in August 2015.

=== YouTube channel ===
Captain Disillusion
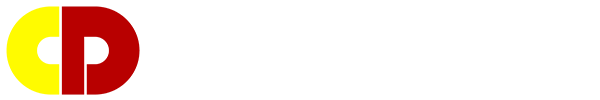
- Captain Disillusion logo
- Genre: Education; comedy
- Created by: Alan Melikdjanian
- Presented by: Alan Melikdjanian
- Voices of: Alan Melikdjanian
- Country of origin: United States
- Original language: English

Production
- Editor: Alan Melikdjanian
- Running time: Varies

Original release
- Network: YouTube
- Release: 2007 – present

The "Captain Disillusion" channel has approximately 2.51 million subscribers and 280 million views (as of October 2026). On the channel, he debunks viral and paranormal "hoax" videos, among others, with a heavy focus on visual effects. He edits his videos using software including Avid Media Composer, Adobe After Effects, Blender, and DaVinci Resolve.

In his videos, Melikdjanian wears a vintage 1980s tracksuit, with the bottom half of his face covered in metallic paint. He uses a wristband gifted to him by James Randi.

Melikdjanian described how he designed his superhero costume:

When it came time to visualize him I just thought what do I have at hand? What can grab people's attention? And really, because it's supposed to be a superhero, what haven't we seen before? What do I have at my disposal that I can actually pull off in terms of attire and make-up? And that's what I had. I got some of this chrome colored make-up at the local party store and I had all those clothes and I would've done my whole face but it's too much work. It works out in terms of illusion revealing reality, and... which one's the reality?

He reviews videos which are "too good to be true," using his expertise in digital editing to break down the video and show how the result was accomplished, sometimes recreating effects from the videos he debunks. His videos contain the motto "Love with your heart. Use your head for everything else."

== Reception ==
Melikdjanian's work has gained recognition from The Huffington Post, Kotaku, Russian TV International, Phil Plait, the James Randi Educational Foundation, Fortean Times, Home Media Magazine, and Sun Sentinel, among others. He has received thanks from people for debunking videos they had shared.

=== Content ===
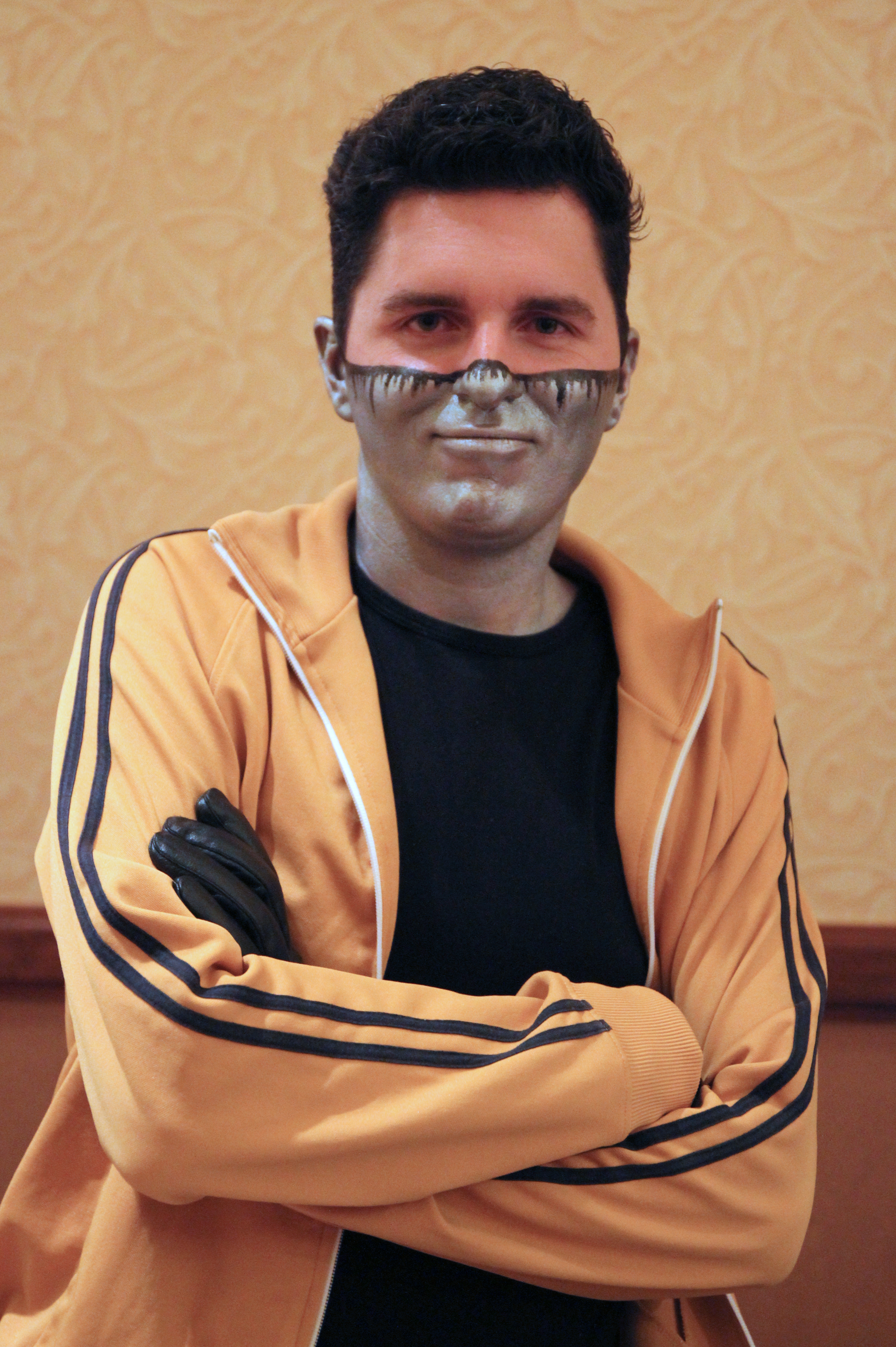
Melikdjanian in character as Captain Disillusion at The Amazing Meeting in 2011

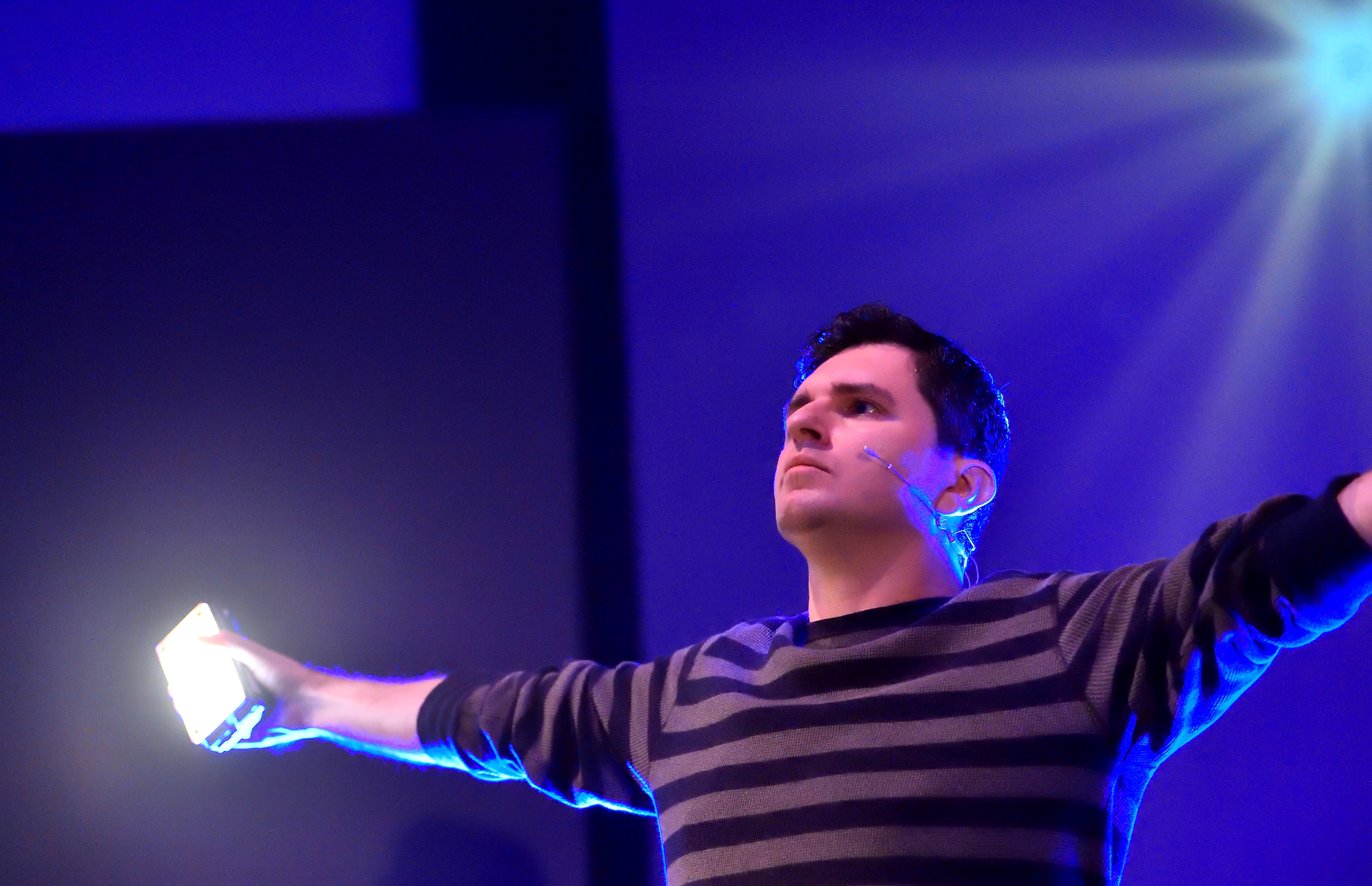
Melikdjanian performing as Captain Disillusion's unpaid intern "Alan" at QED 2016

In 2008, during an interview for The Skeptics' Guide to the Universe, Melikdjanian describes Captain Disillusion as a YouTube web series that tackles paranormal and illusion videos uploaded by others on YouTube. He started this effort as a blog entry on Myspace but later saw these items as ready made scripts for short videos. He notes that Penn & Teller were instrumental to his current interest and eventually found the skeptical movement involved in similar work. He finds that his followers like to learn about the illusions. It is not his intent to spoil legitimate entertainment or a current performer's work. His intent in showing how video illusions are created is to clear up misconceptions. Melikdjanian describes the basis for Openfilm briefly, saying it "was formed for film makers. The goal is to provide higher quality product and a group of serious content creators."

During an interview for The Skeptic Zone, in 2010, Melikdjanian describes Captain Disillusion as a superhero. And in a following 2011 interview, he describes that his work as Captain Disillusion is done "in the maximum fun way possible". He describes his work with James Randi, Randi calling him to participate in The Amaz!ng Meeting and his video work with Randi in a later project. During an interview by Susan Gerbic for Skeptical Inquirer, he states "I think it's best to focus on what you know—something you're already an expert on outside of skepticism—and explore the ways in which it's connected to skepticism. With Captain Disillusion, I connected a random thing—visual effects—to skepticism in a way that people seem to find engaging. I'm sure that can be done with many other fields in different ways."

In a 2017 interview with Richard Saunders from The Skeptic Zone, Melikdjanian described the video effects editing process, saying:

You know, the tools change but the methods really don't. It's all about making things look questionable and kinda crappy and low quality and then you can pretty much get away with anything." In replying to a follow-up question regarding believing what you see on the internet, he said, "When I started out, people just kinda believed everything. It was like shooting fish in a barrel, but these days, people are just really asking me 'is this fake?', 'is this fake?', 'is this fake?', and half the stuff they show me is just, you know, a juggler juggling a lot of balls. They can't conceive that that could be real. People just don't believe anything anymore. I guess that's good for me because I get to explain lots of stuff but I wish people could finally strike that balance where they're not too credulous but they also know not to just dismiss everything out of hand.

In 2026, Melikdjanian told Variety he had signed a first-look deal with streaming platform Nebula. He also discussed a "scripted sci-fi series" in development for the platform.

== Credits ==
=== Filmography ===
| Year | Title | Role | Notes |
|---|---|---|---|
| 2001 | The Realm | Director, composer | |
| 2001 | The Monster Man | Editor | |
| 2001 | Zelimo | Animator | Directed by Aleks Rosenberg |
| 2002 | Сын Неудачника (Son of a Loser) | Editor | Directed by Anatoly Eiramdzhan |
| 2003 | Легкий поцелуй (A peck kiss) | Editor, VFX artist | Directed by Anatoly Eiramdzhan |
| 2006 | Citizen Mavzik | Director, writer, editor, composer | Produced by Vilalan Productions |
| 2008 | Director | VFX artist | Directed by Aleks Rosenberg |
| 2010 | Crimefighters | VFX artist, sound editor | |
| 2013 | Whoops! | Digital effects artist | |
| 2022 | Zomblogalypse | Captain Disillusion (self), VFX artist, camera, sound editor | |

==== Additional work ====
- Still Life (2009) (short), steadicam operator
- The Shift (2013) (thanks), starring Danny Glover

=== Television and web series ===
| Year | Title | Role | Notes |
|---|---|---|---|
| 2007–present | Captain Disillusion | Captain Disillusion; Mr Flare (voice); Himself (as Alan) | |
| 2012 | MSNBC's Caught on Camera | Himself | Episode: "Viral Videos: How? What? Why?"; Episode: "Viral Videos: Bogus or Bona Fide?" |
| 2019 | Could You Survive the Movies? | Captain Disillusion | Episode: "Could You Survive Ghostbusters??" |
| 2021 | Dynamo Dream | TERD (voice) | Episode: "Salad Mug" |
| 2024 | Dynamo Dream | TERD (voice) | Episode: "Prepare for Execution" |

== Awards ==
| Year | Award | Category | Result | Ref. |
|---|---|---|---|---|
| 2001 | BFA Film Award (IFAC) | Best Thesis Film | Won | |
| 2019 | 11th Shorty Awards | Best in Weird | Won | |
