= Boundary Break =

YouTube series

- Genre: Educational
- Created by: Shesez
- Directed by: Shesez
- Theme music composer: F1NG3RS
- Country of origin: United States
- Original language: English
- No. of episodes: 155

Production
- Running time: 15 min.

Original release
- Release: April 27, 2016 – present

Related
- Region Break; Sequence Break

Boundary Break is a YouTube series hosted by Derek Forte, better known as Internet personality Shesez. In the series, Shesez explores locations normally unaccessible in video games by using unofficial virtual camera mods. The series started on April 27, 2016, with an episode exploring Super Smash Bros. Brawl. During its run, the show has made multiple notable discoveries in its covered games, including Animal Crossing: New Horizons, Star Wars Jedi: Fallen Order, P.T., Shovel Knight, Grand Theft Auto V, Untitled Goose Game, The Simpsons: Hit & Run, and Mario Kart 8. For certain episodes, Shesez has spoken with people involved with the development of the covered games, including Kyle Pittman, a programmer for Borderlands 2, and David D'Angelo, a programmer for Shovel Knight.

== Reception ==
Boundary Break's creator and host, Shesez, was nominated for a Shorty Award in the Gaming category for his work on the series, where he was a finalist. Kotaku's Zack Zwiezen praised the Boundary Break episode covering Lego Star Wars: The Video Game, calling it his favorite episode of the series.
