= Is this a pigeon? =

Internet meme

The original "Is this a pigeon?" frame

Is this a pigeon? (Japanese: これは鳩ですか?, Hepburn: Kore wa hato desu ka?) is an Internet meme and quote of the protagonist from the 1990s Japanese anime television series The Brave Fighter of Sun Fighbird. The image originates from a scene where the main character named Yutaro Katori mistakenly identifies a butterfly as a pigeon. The image was originally posted on Tumblr.

== Origin ==
The meme features Yutaro Katori, an android made by professor Hiroshi Amano, who misidentifies a butterfly as a pigeon while studying terrestrial nature in a scene from Season 1, Episode 3 of The Brave Fighter of Sun Fighbird, which first aired in Japan in 1991.

The scene was uploaded to Tumblr in 2011, spawning many variations and becoming a popular meme where the butterfly and Katori's subtitle are relabeled to suggest a different mistaken identification. It had another run of popularity in 2018.

== Reception ==
On June 27, 2013, BuzzFeed highlighted the meme in their compilation article titled "27 Subtitles That Have Gone Awesomely Wrong." Mashable described it as a new Distracted boyfriend meme of 2018. The Daily Dot described it as the best meme template of 2018, while Thrillist described it as the dankest memes of the 2010s.
