= Joshua Weissman =

American celebrity chef (born 1996)

- Born: January 9, 1996 (age 30); Los Angeles, California, U.S.
- Occupations: Content creator; Cookbook author
- Spouse: Kate Weissman

YouTube information
- Channel: Joshua Weissman
- Genre: Cooking
- Subscribers: 10.5 million
- Views: 2.2 billion
- Last updated: January 17, 2026
- Website: joshuaweissman.com

Joshua Weissman (born January 9, 1996, Los Angeles, California, U.S.) is a chef, content creator, and cookbook author. His main platform is his eponymous culinary YouTube channel. His book Joshua Weissman: An Unapologetic Cookbook became a #1 New York Times bestseller in 2021.

== Biography ==
Weissman launched his YouTube channel in 2015, focusing on detailed cooking tutorials and culinary explorations.

In 2021, Weissman published Joshua Weissman: An Unapologetic Cookbook, which became a #1 New York Times bestseller in the Advice, How-To & Miscellaneous category. It appeared on the list in nine weeks (with the caveat that "some retailers report[ed] receiving bulk orders"). He was featured in Variety's 2021 Young Hollywood Impact Report.

Weissman's third book Texture Over Taste was released in 2023. It also became a New York Times bestseller, again with the caveat that "some retailers report[ed] receiving bulk orders".

In 2023, Joshua Weissman collaborated with Williams-Sonoma on the NKH Silicone FSC Wood Spatula to support No Kid Hungry, a campaign by Share Our Strength aimed at ending childhood hunger in America.

Weissman has appeared in various media outside his own channels, including teaching Drew Barrymore how to make Austin breakfast tacos on her show, on Food Diaries by Harper's Bazaar on YouTube, and having his home featured on the Architectural Digest series Open Door.

He launched his first restaurant, Ben & Lynn's, in September 2026.

== Personal life ==
Joshua Weissman is married to Kate Weissman, who graduated from South Texas College of Law Houston with a Juris Doctor degree. Before her legal career, she was an eighth-grade history teacher. Weissman is of Jewish descent.

== Books ==
- Joshua Weissman: The Slim Palate Paleo Cookbook. 2014. Victory Belt Publishing. 224 pages. 978–1628600117
- Joshua Weissman: An Unapologetic Cookbook. September 14, 2021. DK Publishing. 264 pages. 978–1615649983
- Joshua Weissman: Texture Over Taste. October 17, 2023. DK Publishing. 264 pages. 978-0744063509
