= Caitlin Covington =

American lifestyle blogger and influencer

Caitlin Covington (born 1990 or 1991) is an American lifestyle blogger and influencer. She is best known for being the face of the internet meme "Christian Girl Autumn", which The New York Times describes as satirizing "a certain type of, usually white, woman who is obsessed with all things fall".

== Career ==
In 2011, Covington originally started her blog Southern Curls & Pearls for personal purposes, when she was a junior studying broadcasting at the University of North Carolina at Chapel Hill. After graduation, she worked at a public relations and marketing firm in Greenville, South Carolina while continuing her personal blog and Instagram profile. A local shop owner offered to send her a dress if she would wear it for a photo on her Instagram profile.

In the mid-2010s, Covington became mainly known for her lifestyle content on Instagram.

By 2016, she had 370,000 followers on Instagram; however changes to Instagram in 2016 led to a drop in user engagement, and she later determined that she would need to diversify her sources of income to not depend on Instagram.

=== "Christian Girl Autumn" internet meme ===
gio
(@lasagnabby)
tweeted:

Hot Girl Summer is coming to an end, get ready for Christian Girl Autumn 🍂😍

August 9, 2019

In 2019, a photo of Covington and fellow influencer Emily Gemma, taken in 2016, went viral on the internet after it was reposted to Twitter by New York–based college student and online influencer Isabella Markel (Note: Markel published the "Christian Girl Autumn" meme using a social media account with the name Blizzy McGuire.) with the description "Hot Girl Summer is coming to an end, get ready for Christian Girl Autumn". Covington and Gemma were described by Buzzfeed News as wearing "swooping scarves, matching leather bags, brown ankle boots, and terrifyingly well-coiffed curls". Inspired by internet memes based on Megan Thee Stallion's song "Hot Girl Summer", which was released earlier that year, Markel found and republished the photo without knowing the identities of the photo subjects.

In response to the memes, some social media users made jokes which made judgements on the assumed "cultural ignorance" and anti-gay attitudes of the women in the photo. Covington and Gemma addressed judgements of their character in an interview with Buzzfeed News, in which Covington said "I'm a nice person and I love everyone and I'm accepting of everyone".

Covington has continued to publish similar themed social media posts in the autumn. In 2020, she donated $500 to a GoFundMe fundraising campaign started by Markel for her medical costs.

== Personal life ==
Covington was born in 1990 or 1991. She is a Methodist Christian.
