= Evan Puschak =

American video essayist, journalist and YouTuber (born 1988)

- Born: August 31, 1988 (age 38)
- Education: Boston University
- Occupation: Video essayist
- Known for: Nerdwriter video essays
- Website: nerdwriter.com

Evan Puschak is an American video essayist, journalist and creator of the YouTube channel The NerdWriter. Previously he was a multimedia editor at MSNBC and hosted the Discovery Channel show Seeker Daily. In 2017, Forbes named him one of their "30 Under 30 in Media".

== Career ==
Puschak was a multimedia editor at MSNBC and hosted the Discovery Channel show Seeker Daily.

The Nerdwriter series began in 2011 and has been updated almost every week exploring a range of topics from film to current affairs to sitcoms to philosophy. In a video uploaded to the channel in August 2022, Puschak revealed he originally started the series in order to build an audience for a novel he had written. Though he abandoned the goal, he discovered a passion for the platform and for creating video essays. He explains his approach to the wide range of topics dissected in the Nerdwriter essays, "It's in the construction of a video that I understand and learn the most. I just move toward what interests me in that week, or that month."

The popularity of The Nerdwriter has attracted attention from industry personnel, media outlets, and film schools. His most popular video essays include How Donald Trump Answers A Question, Harry Potter & The Prisoner of Azkaban: Why It's The Best, and Sherlock: How To Film Thought. His popular essay on Trump's speeches elicited an article from Slate, "Trump’s Tower of Babble."

== Personal life ==
After graduating from Boston University he moved to Paris, France, for six months to write the novel, Big City. Puschak resides in Spain.

== Works ==
- Puschak, Evan (2022). Escape into Meaning. Atria Books. ISBN 978-1-9821-6395-2.
