= Cyrene Quiamco =

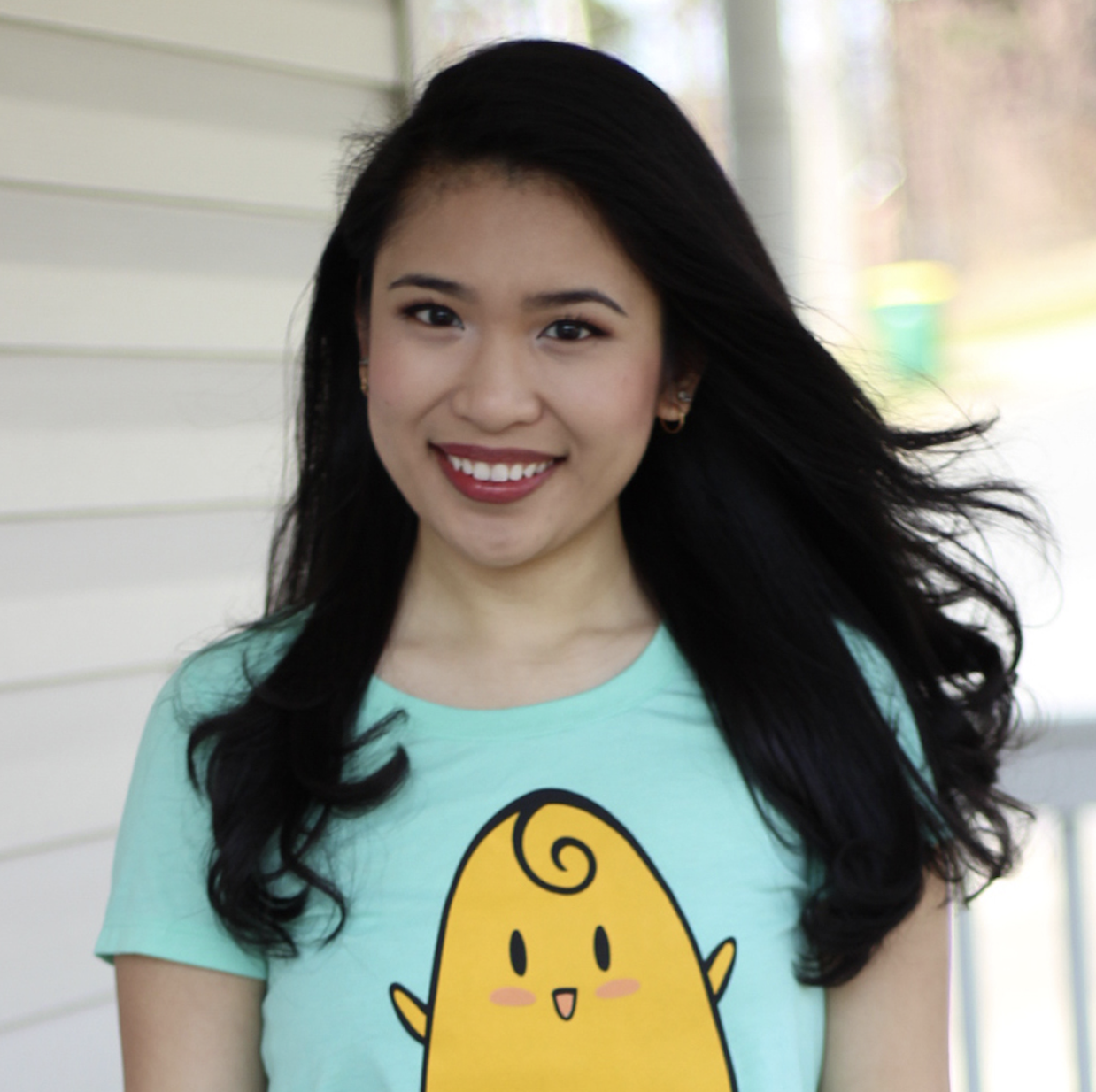
- Born: March 8, 1989 (age 36); Bacolod City, Philippines
- Known for: Augmented Reality Snapchat Filters/Lenses Artist
- Title: Social media artist, influencer, author

Cyrene Quiamco (born March 8, 1989), better known as CyreneQ, is a Filipino-American social media artist, influencer, author and Augmented Reality Lens Creator. She is known for creating art on Snapchat. She is the ambassador of the National Digital Arts Awards in the Philippines. Quiamco produced and premiered the world's first featured-length Snapchat-made documentary at the Bentonville Film Festival.

== Early life ==
Salathiel Cyrene Ganzon Quiamco was born March 8, 1989, in Bacolod, Philippines. At the age of 7, she moved to Arkansas, United States with her mother and sister.

She attended and graduated from St. Theresa Catholic School in Little Rock, Arkansas, a part of the Diocese of Little Rock. Additionally, she attended Parkview Magnet High School and the University of Arkansas at Little Rock.

== Career ==
Quiamco was a web designer for Verizon before becoming a full-time social media artist and influencer. She makes traditional, digital, and augmented reality art on Snapchat. As an early adopter, she was one of the first individuals able to make a living from the platform and was subsequently recognized by Snapchat.

In 2017 she published her first book titled 11 Seconds to Success.
