= Brad Mondo =

American hairstylist

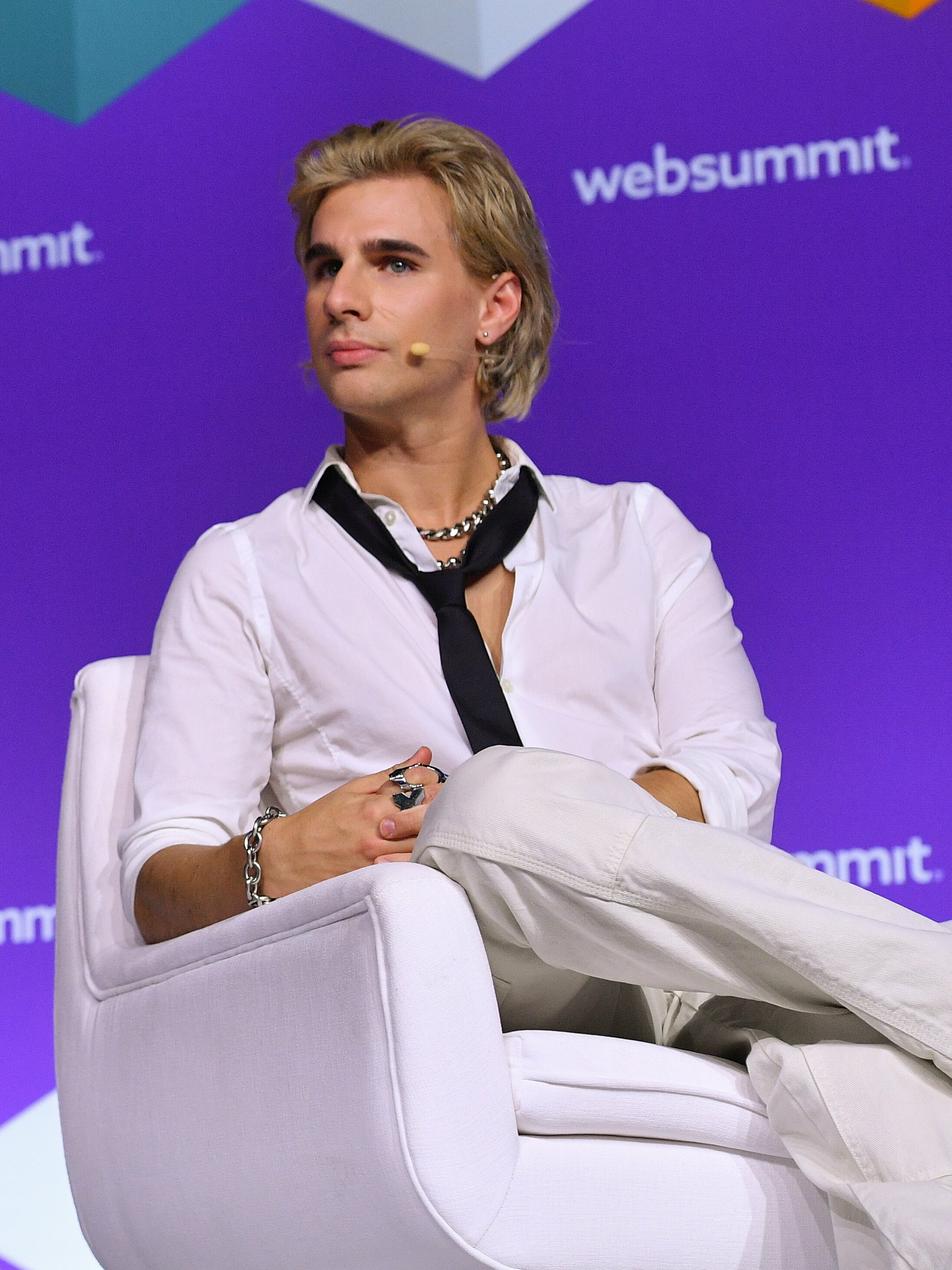
- Brad Mondo in 2022
- Born: October 28, 1994 (age 31); Franklin, Massachusetts
- Other name: Brad Mondo
- Occupations: Hairstylist; YouTuber; entrepreneur

TikTok information
- Page: bradmondonyc
- Followers: 10.7 million

YouTube information
- Channel: Brad Mondo
- Years active: 2015 – present
- Subscribers: 8.68 million
- Views: 2 billion
- Last updated: January 30, 2026
- Website: xmondohair.com

Brad Gesimondo (born October 28, 1994), commonly known as Brad Mondo, is an American hairstylist, entrepreneur and social media personality.

== Early life ==
Mondo was born October 28, 1994 to Janine and Jessie Gesimondo in Franklin, Massachusetts. He has two brothers, Eric and John. In his childhood, he followed in his father's footsteps as a hairstylist. He started his YouTube career at the age of 12, and was a sales associate with Calvin Klein at 16.

== Career ==
Mondo became popular through his "Hairdresser Reacts" videos on social media and educational videos on hair styling. He has also styled celebrities such as Charli D'Amelio, Vanessa Hudgens, Heather Marks, and Shay Mitchell.

Mondo founded the hair care products brand XMondo Hair in 2019 and launched XMondo Color in November 2020. He won the Hair Influencer of the Year award at the 2020 American Influencer Awards.
