= Alex Aïnouz =

French food YouTuber

- Other name: French Guy Cooking

YouTube information
- Channel: Alex
- Years active: 2013–2024
- Subscribers: 2.09 million
- Views: 239 million
- Last updated: 23 September, 2025

Alexis Gabriel Aïnouz, also known by the alias French Guy Cooking, is a French food YouTuber. He makes cooking tutorials involving spins on French dishes with a focus on experimentation, and also makes short-form docuseries documenting his process of learning new techniques and recipes. He runs his YouTube channel in English to reach a wider audience, and promote French culinary culture abroad. Aïnouz is a self-taught cook with an electrical engineering background with experience in marketing. He debuted on YouTube in 2013. His recipes for croissants and brioche were published by The Times in London in 2018. He won the award for "Best Food" at the 11th Shorty Awards in 2019. He is a regular contributor to Milk Street Radio.
