= Pimm Fox =

- Born: 1960 (age 65–66); Brooklyn, New York
- Education: Columbia University (B.A., Architecture)
- Occupations: business journalist, news anchor
- Title: host of Taking Stock host on Bloomberg Radio

Pimm Fox is the news anchor of Taking Stock, a program of business interviews and financial news analysis broadcast daily on Bloomberg Radio. The program was previously also broadcast on Bloomberg Television. He discusses industry and market trends with guests and financial experts.

== Personal life ==
Fox was born in Brooklyn, NY in 1960. He attended New York City public schools and graduated high school from Collegiate School (New York). He earned his bachelor's degree at Columbia College, Columbia University. He served in the US Navy.

=== Host shows ===
- Taking Stock (since 2006)
