= BITE Beauty =

Canadian cosmetics company

- Type: Private
- Industry: Personal care
- Founded: 2011
- Founder: Susanne Langmuir
- Defunct: 2022
- Fate: Acquired and brand retired
- Successor: Lip.Lab
- Headquarters: Toronto, Canada
- Parent: Kendo Holdings
- Website: www.bitebeauty.com

BITE Beauty was a Canadian cosmetics company specializing in lip products. The brand was carried exclusively at Sephora. The company was acquired by Kendo Holdings, a company owned by LVMH, in 2014 and the name of the brand was replaced by Lip.Lab in 2022.

All BITE's products were made with food-grade, vegan ingredients and were infused with resveratrol. The factory was located in Toronto; by 2015, the factory produced around 2,000 items a day.

== History ==
The brand was founded by Susanne Langmuir in 2011 and launched in 2012.

As of 2022, BITE Beauty ceased to exist. BITE Beauty now operates as "Lip.Lab", a brick-and-mortar retailtainment experience where customers can create their own lipsticks choose the texture, scent, case color and have a selected name engraved on the lipstick tube and lip balms.

As of December 2022, there were 10 lip labs in operation, the locations include:

- Two boutiques in New York City: Soho (the flagship store) and Williamsburg
- Toronto
- Two boutiques in California: Irvine and Los Angeles
- Las Vegas
- West Loop Chicago
- Northpark Center, Dallas
- Paris at La Bon Marche
- Downtown Nashville
