= Decorating Cents =

American television series

- Genre: Reality; Home improvement
- Starring: Joan Steffend
- Country of origin: United States

Production
- Running time: 30 minutes
- Production company: Edelman Productions

Original release
- Network: HGTV
- Release: October 7, 1997 – 2008

Decorating Cents is an American television series that aired on HGTV from 1997 to 2008. It was filmed entirely in Minnesota.

== Premise ==
Decorating Cents is hosted by Joan Steffend, a former anchor on KARE 11. In each episode, a crew of interior designers is challenged to refashion a room in someone's home within a few hours and on a budget of $500.

== History ==
The show was developed in 1997 when HGTV hired Minnesota-based Edelman Productions to come up with a format involving "decorating for less". Familiar with Steffend from her tenure as a local news anchor, the company's founders asked her if she would be interested in hosting the show, to which Steffend agreed, adding she "liked to decorate for less in her own home".

In 2025, the show went viral online due to its frequent unconventional design choices. In July 2026, an unaired pilot episode of a reboot was uploaded to HGTV's YouTube channel in which the budget is increased to $1,000.
