= 9th Streamy Awards =

2019 awards ceremony recognizing online video

- Date: December 13, 2019
- Location: The Beverly Hilton, Beverly Hills, California
- Presented by: Streamys Blue Ribbon Panel

Highlights
- Most awards: David Dobrik (4)
- Most nominations: David Dobrik (11)
- Audience Choice: Good Mythical Morning (Show of the Year); Tana Mongeau (Creator of the Year)

Television/radio coverage
- Network: YouTube
- Runtime: 2 hours
- Viewership: 3 million
- Produced by: Dick Clark Productions; Tubefilter

The 9th Annual Streamy Awards was the ninth installment of the Streamy Awards honoring the best in American streaming television series and their creators. The awards was split into three sections with different themes: the main Streamy Awards, the second annual Streamys Brand Awards, and the Third Annual Streamys Purpose Awards. The main ceremony was streamed live on YouTube from The Beverly Hilton in Beverly Hills, California on December 13, 2019. It was the first Streamy Awards ceremony to run without a host, instead featuring segments from online content creators to highlight the diversity of the industry. The show also highlighted international creators with the addition of multiple international categories and added a new Technology category.

On September 11, 2019, the 2nd annual Streamys Brand Awards were held during the IAB Digital Content NewFronts West at NeueHouse Hollywood and hosted by Emile Ennis Jr. The awards honored innovation in brand advertising. On December 9, 2019, the 2nd annual Purpose Awards @ The Streamys were held at the YouTube Space LA, hosted by Jay Shetty. The awards recognized digital creators, brands, and nonprofits who have used their influence for a greater good.

== Performers ==
The 9th Streamy Awards featured musical performances from Normani and Kim Petras. Petras' performance was introduced by Paris Hilton. The Streamy Purpose Awards featured a musical performance by Savannah Outen. Niki and Gabi performed together, and then Gabi introduced Niki to perform on her own.

Performers at the 9th Streamy Awards
Artist(s)	Song(s)
Normani	"Motivation"
Kim Petras	"Icy"
Savannah Outen	"The Hard Way"
Niki and Gabi	"R U"
Niki DeMar	"Sad Holiday"

== Winners and nominees ==
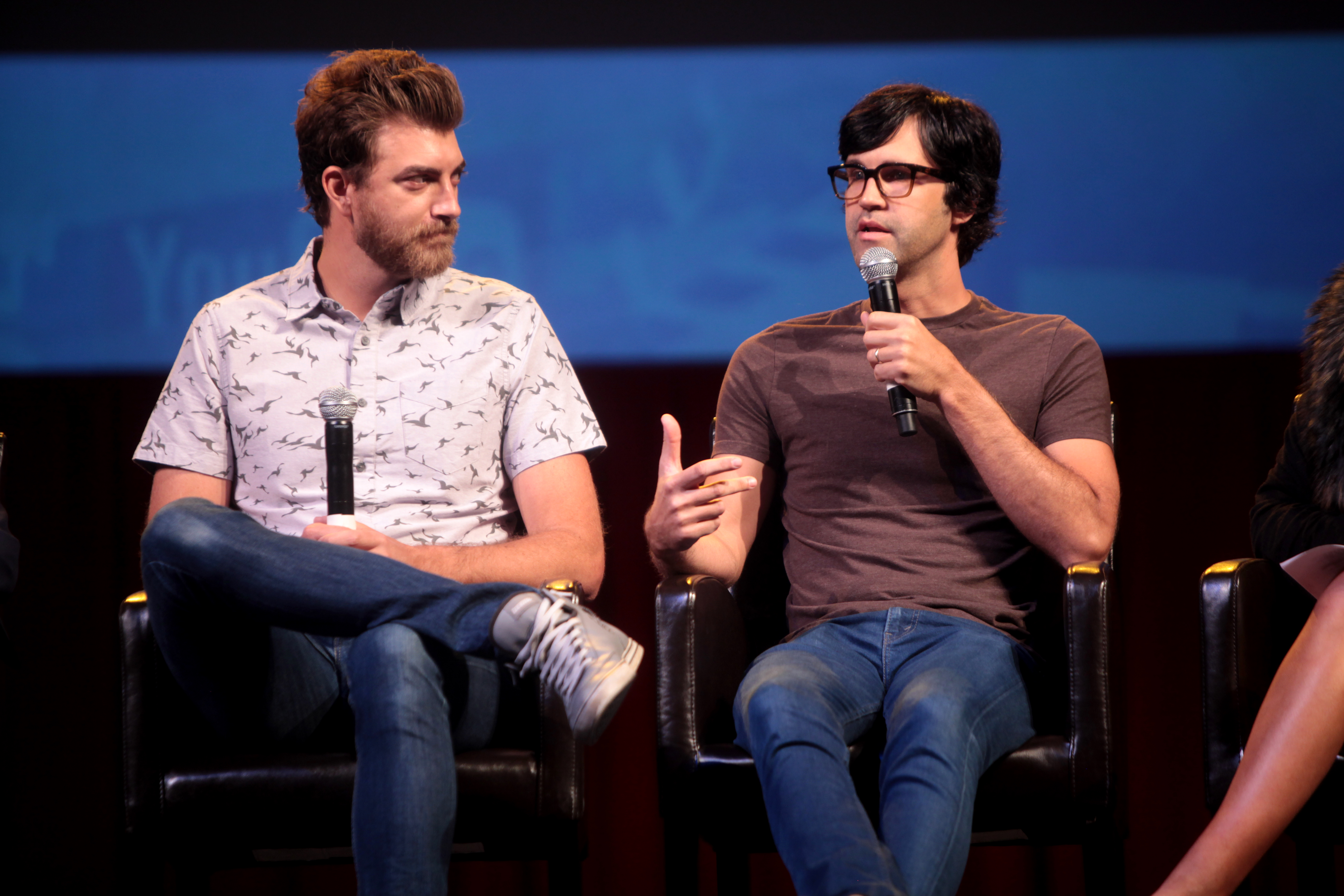
Rhett & Link of Good Mythical Morning, winners of the Audience Choice Award for Show of the Year

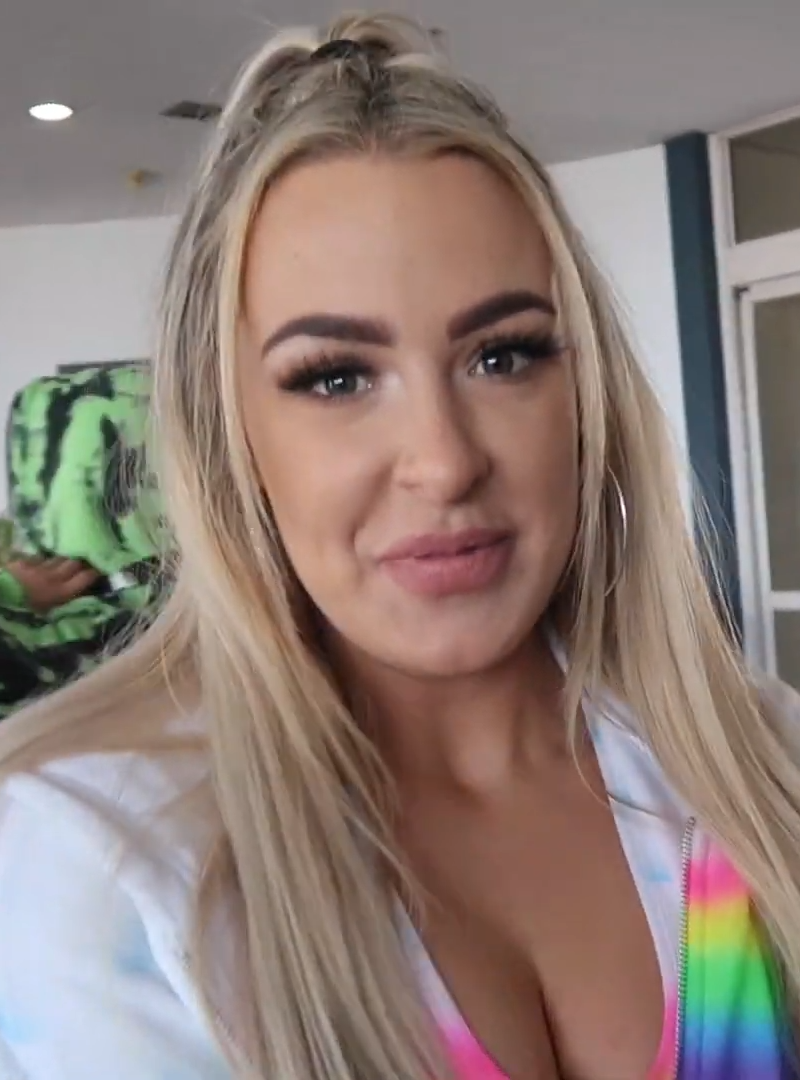
Tana Mongeau, winner of the Audience Choice Award for Creator of the Year

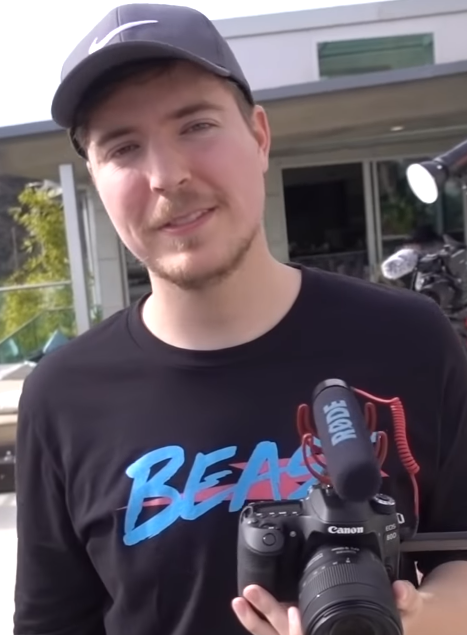
MrBeast, winner of the Breakout Creator awards

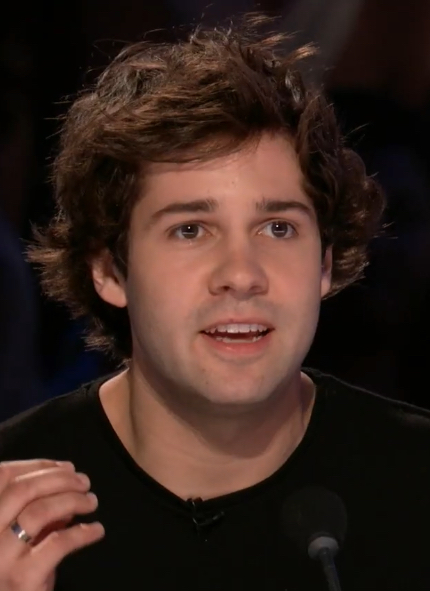
David Dobrik, winner of the First Person category, Best Collaboration, Best Ensemble Cast for his vlog, and Best Brand Engagement

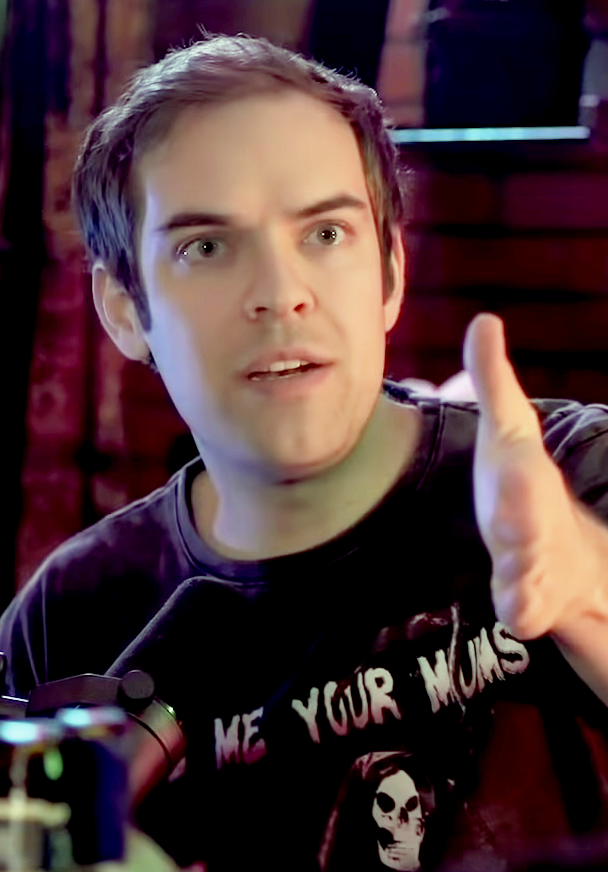
Jack Douglass, winner of the Comedy category

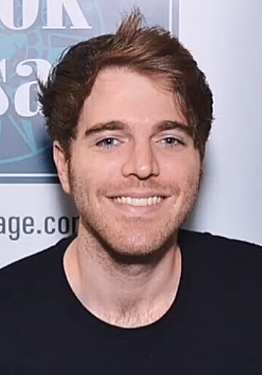
Shane Dawson, winner of Best Documentary

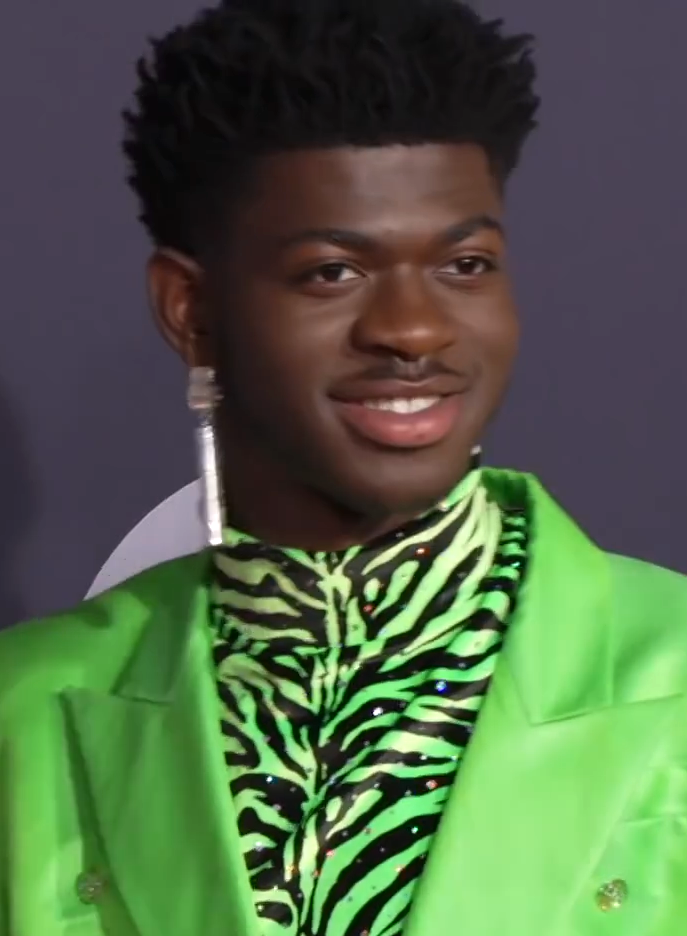
Lil Nas X, winner of the Breakthrough Artist award

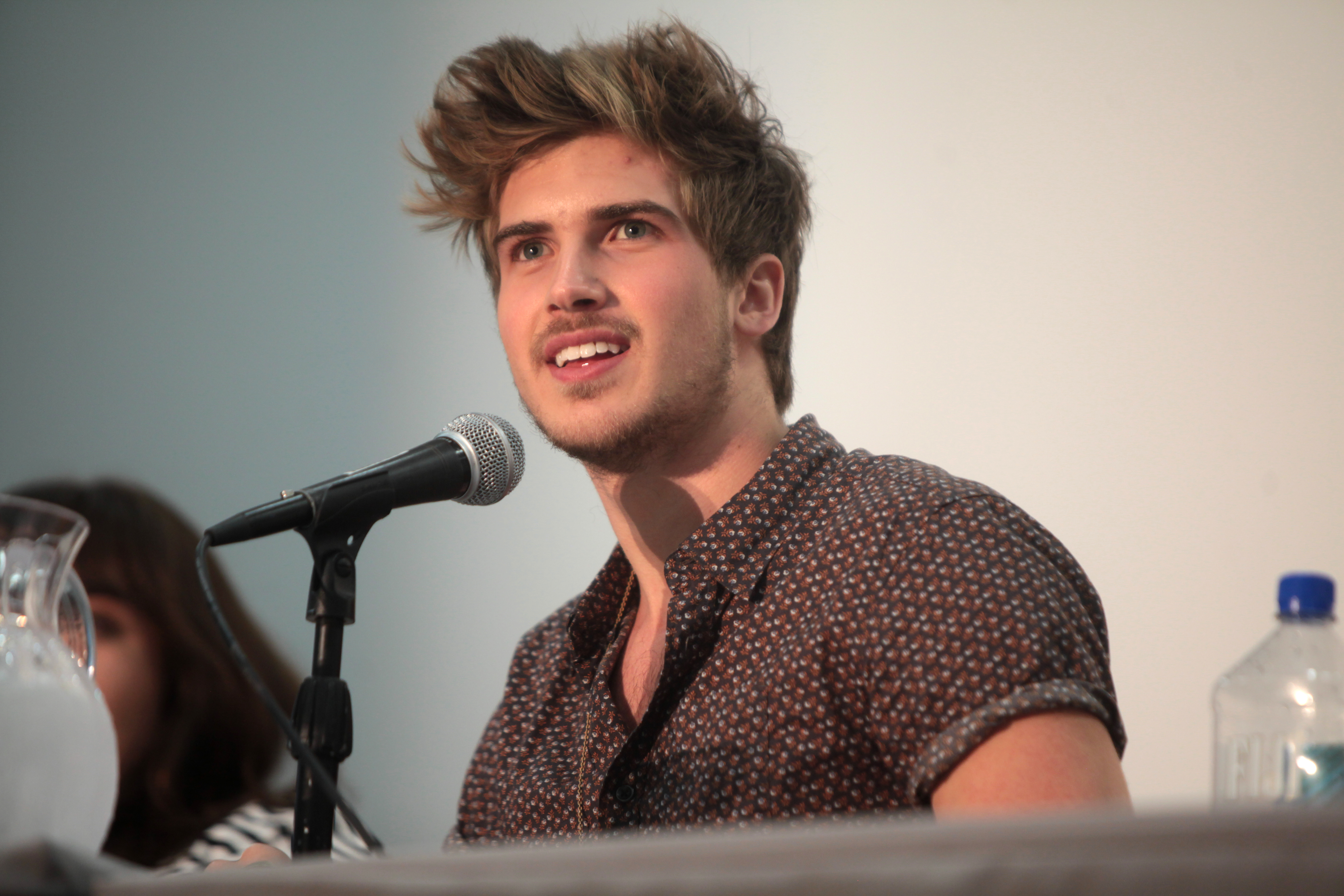
Joey Graceffa, winner of Best Unscripted Series

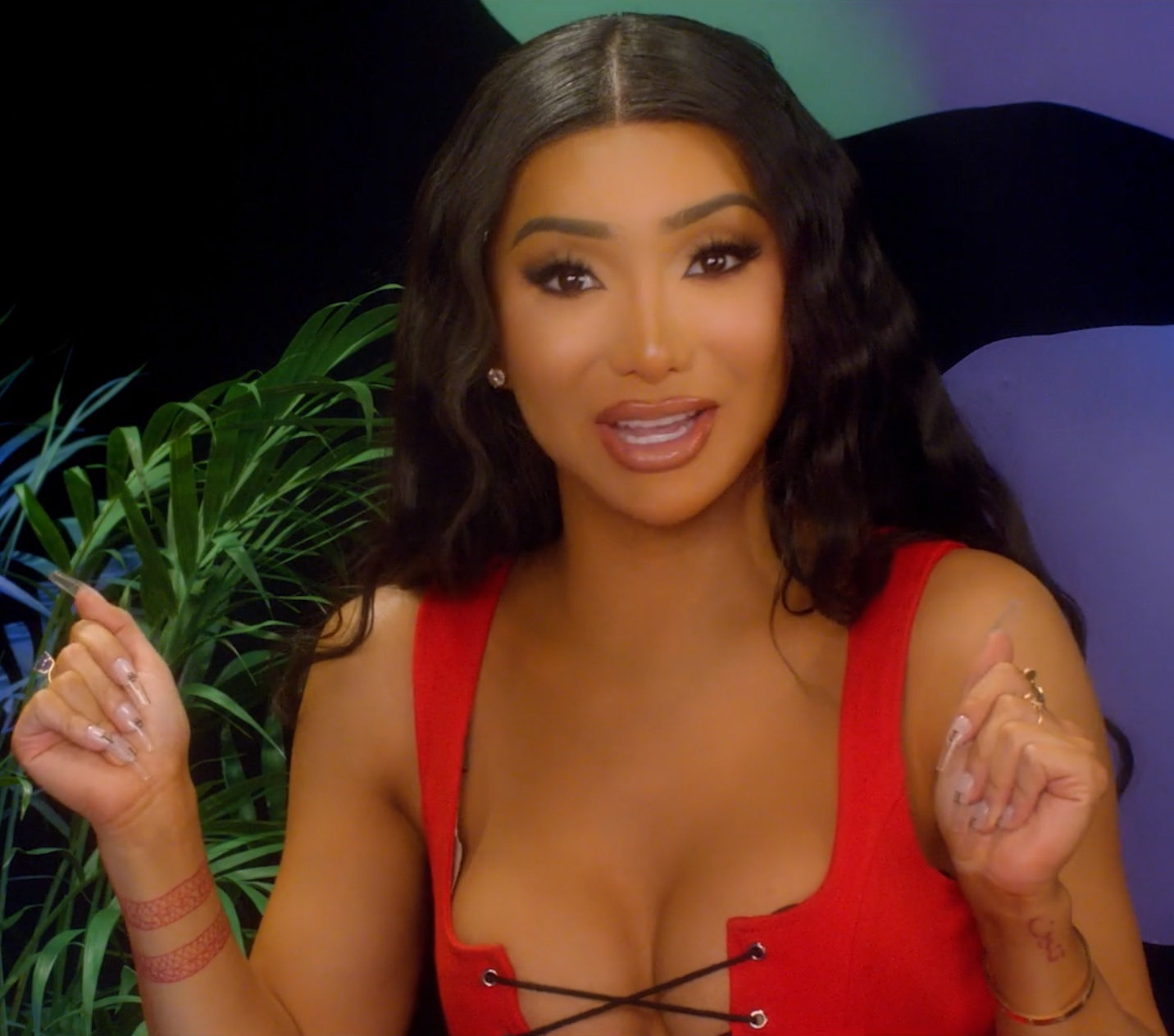
Nikita Dragun, winner of the Beauty category

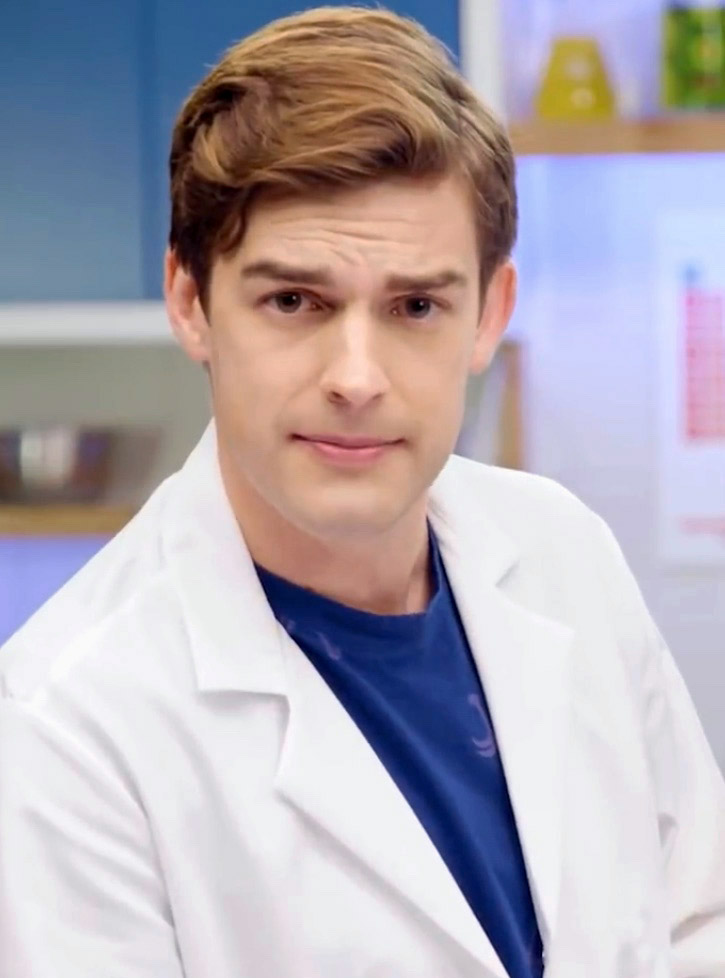
MatPat, winner of the Gaming category

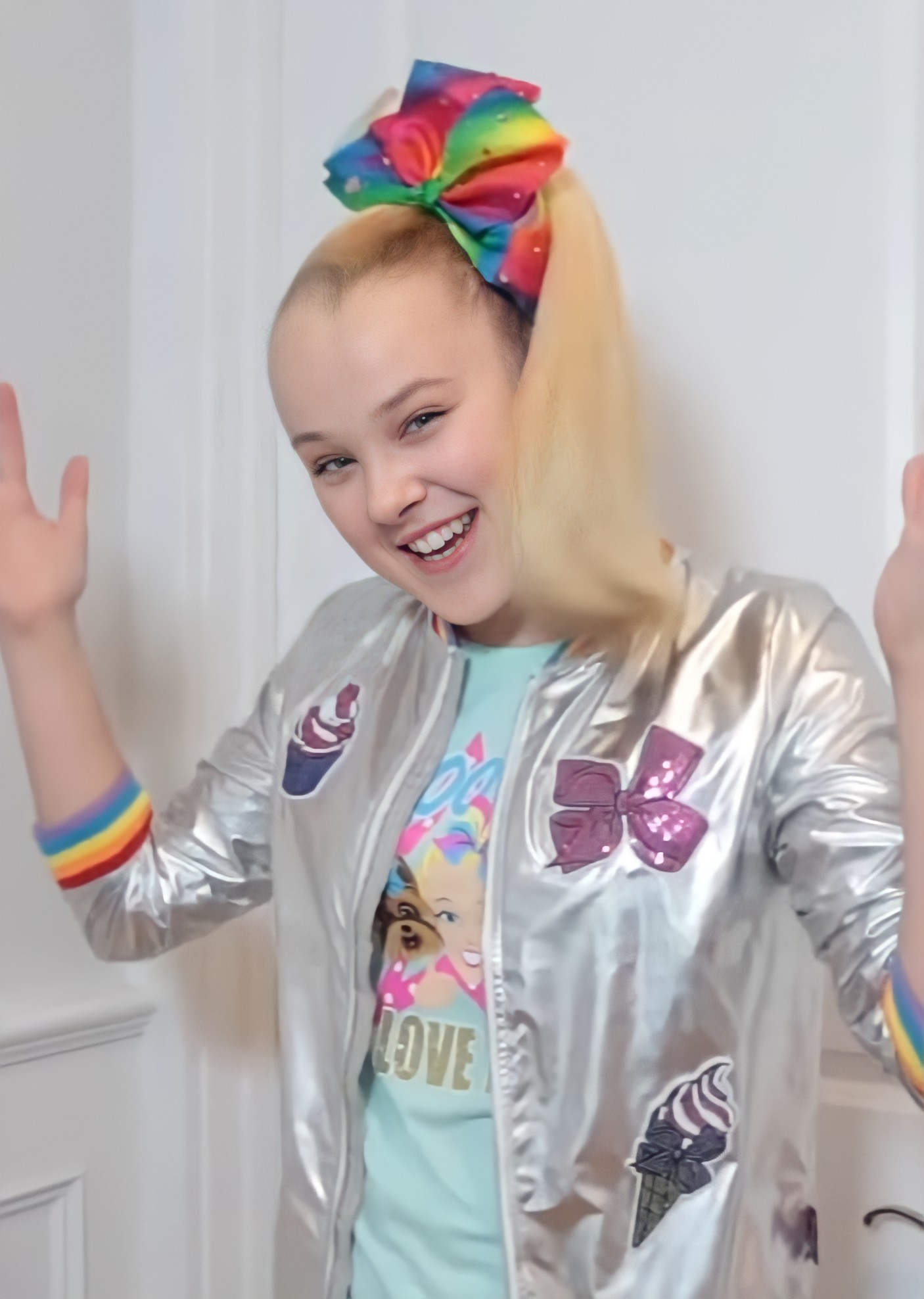
JoJo Siwa, winner of the Kids and Family category

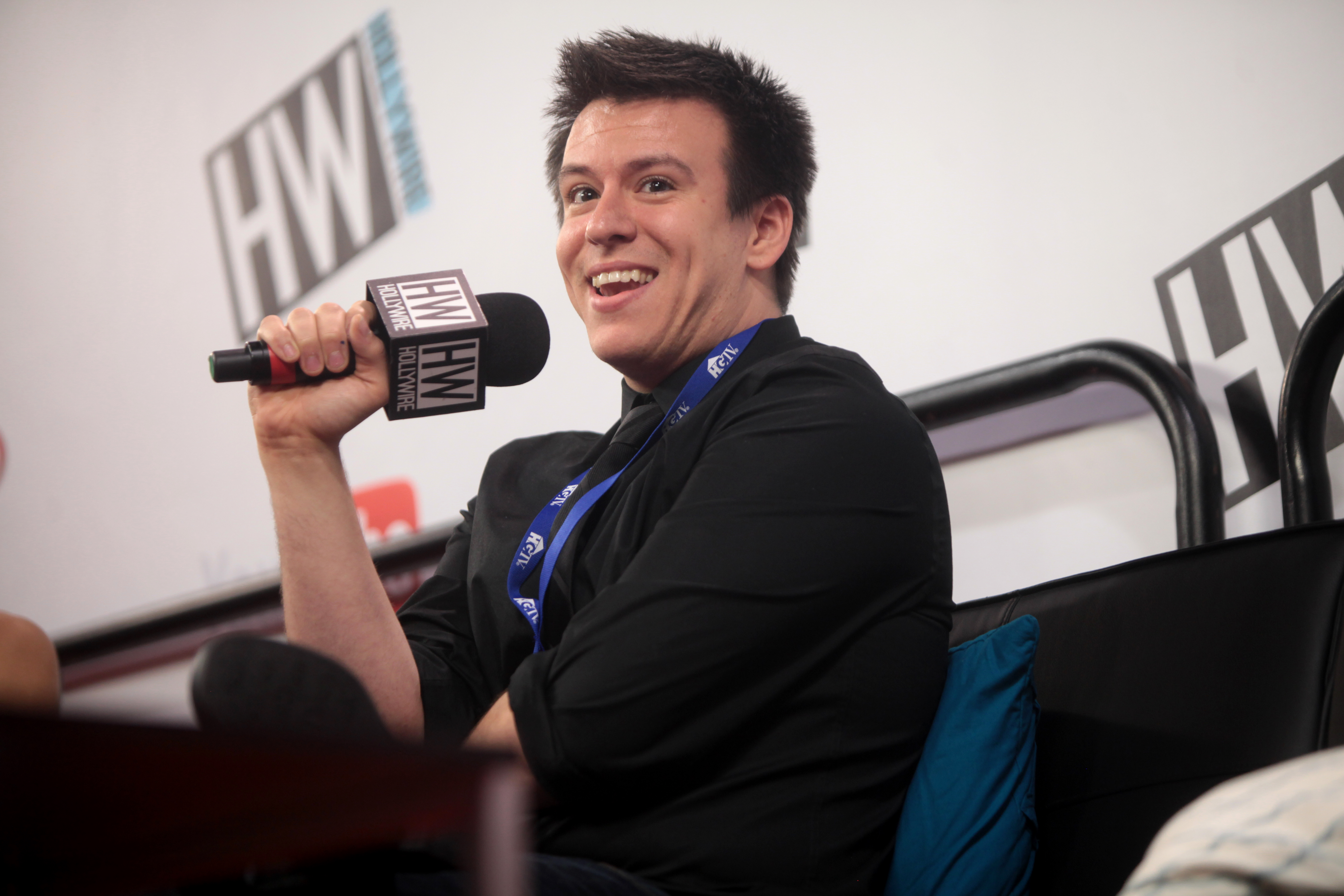
Philip DeFranco, winner of the News category

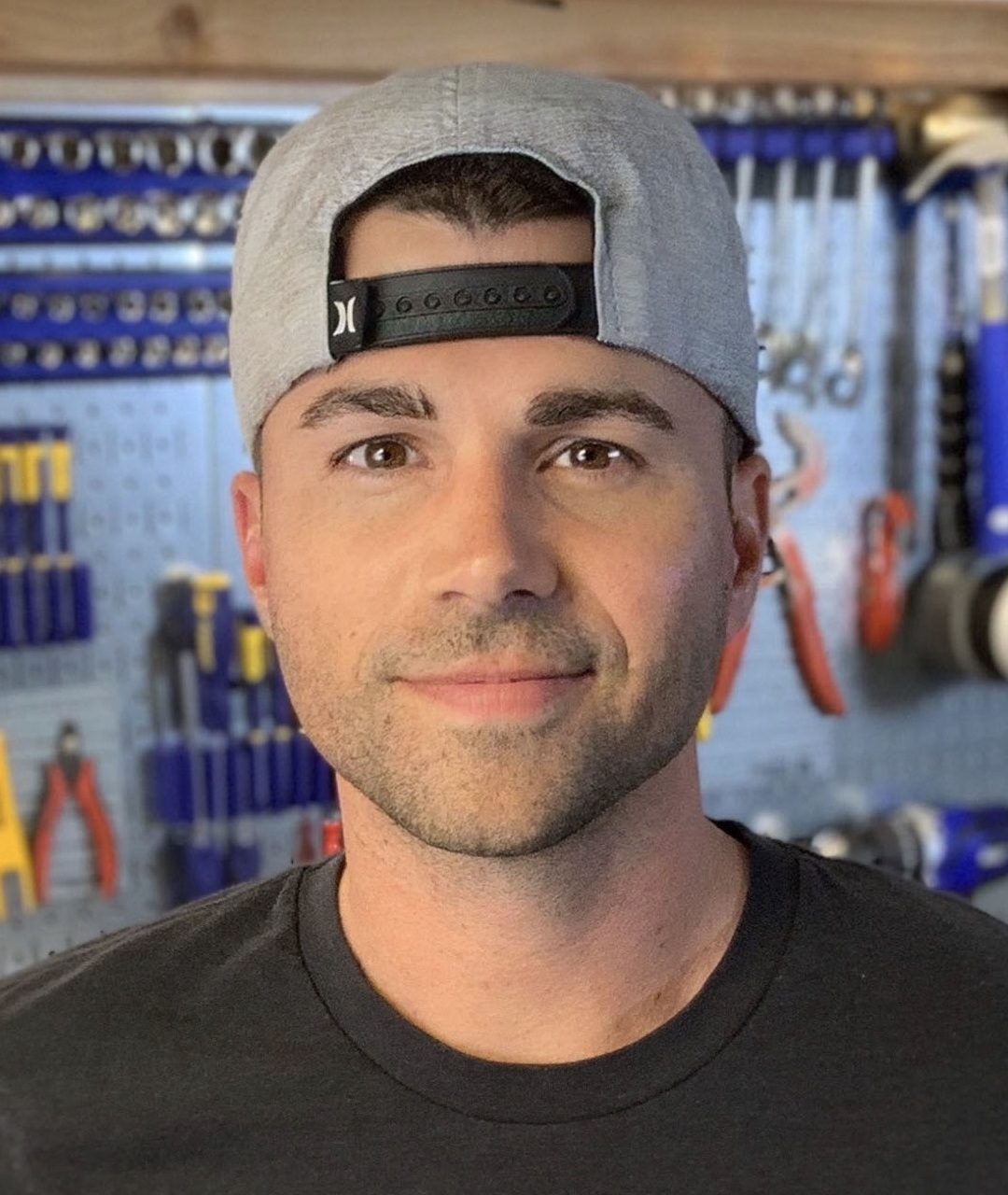
Mark Rober, winner of the Science or Education category

The nominees were announced on October 16, 2019. 23 of the awards were announced on December 11 at the Streamy Premiere Awards in Santa Monica, hosted by Niki and Gabi. The remaining awards were announced at the main ceremony at The Beverly Hilton on December 13, 2019. Winners of the categories were selected by the Streamys Blue Ribbon Panel except for the Audience Choice awards which were put to a public vote.

Winners are listed first, in bold.

OVERALL
Audience Choice Award for Show of the Year	Audience Choice Award for Creator of the Year
**Good Mythical Morning**; Chicken Girls; Escape the Night: Season 4; The Game Master; Hot Ones; The Philip DeFranco Show; REACT; Red Table Talk; Tiny Meat Gang Podcast; The Try Guys	**Tana Mongeau**; Collins Key; David Dobrik; Emma Chamberlain; Lilly Singh; Loren Gray; MrBeast; Ninja; Safiya Nygaard; Simply Nailogical
Breakout Creator	International: Asia Pacific
**MrBeast**; Danny Gonzalez; Joana Ceddia; LARRAY; Lizzy Capri	**Fischer's-フィッシャーズ-**; ACAU YouTube; Kento Bento; RackaRacka; Tiền Zombie v4
International: Europe, Middle East, and Africa	International: Latin America
**MarkAngelComedy**; Fozi Mozi; L'atelier de Roxane; Mikecrack; Stacia Mar	**Camila Loures**; Enaldinho; Enchufe.tv; kevsho; Mis Pastelitos
Action or Sci-Fi	Animated
**Sam and Colby**; Huluween; Mordeo; The Look-See; Super Science Friends	**Andrei Terbea**; Danny Casale; gen:LOCK; illymation; TheOdd1sOut
Comedy	Documentary
**Jack Douglass**; Anwar Jibawi; CalebCity; Gus Johnson; Hannah Stocking	**The Secret World of Jeffree Star (by Shane Dawson)**; The Brave (by Great Big Story); BuzzFeed Unsolved Network; The Curse of Don's Plum (by New York Post); Stonewall: OutLoud (by WOWPresents)
First Person	Podcast
**David Dobrik**; JablinskiGames; Simply Nailogical; Emma Chamberlain; Tana Mongeau	**Impaulsive**; H3 Podcast; On Purpose with Jay Shetty; Tiny Meat Gang Podcast; VIEWS with David Dobrik and Jason Nash
MUSIC AND SOCIAL VIDEO
Breakthrough Artist	Live Streamer
**Lil Nas X**; Conan Gray; Lewis Capaldi; Lil Tecca; Lizzo	**Ninja**; DrLupo; shroud; Tfue; Twitch Rivals
SERIES
Scripted Series	Unscripted Series
**Blame the Hero (by Brandon Rogers)**; Chicken Girls (by Brat); How To Survive a Break Up w/ Eva Gutowski (by AwesomenessTV); Two Sides (by New Form); You Decide (by Destorm Power)	**Escape the Night: Season 4 (by Joey Graceffa)**; I Spent a Day With... (by Anthony Padilla); Middle Ground (by Jubilee Media); Phone Swap (by Vertical Networks); UNHhhh (by WOWPresents)
Indie Series	
**The Feels**; Beef in Brentwood; Black Girls Guide to Fertility; Damaged Goods (by VAM STUDIO); Take One Thing Off (by Scout Durwood)	
SUBJECT AWARDS
Beauty	Dance
**Nikita Dragun**; Brad Mondo; James Charles; Jeffree Star; Jackie Aina	**Dytto**; Nicole Laeno; WilldaBeast Adams; Kyle Hanagami; Matt Steffanina
Fashion	Food
**Patrick Starrr**; bestdressed; Koleen Diaz; Sierra Schultzzie; With Love, Leena	**Binging with Babish**; Food Fears (by Good Mythical Morning); Gordon Ramsay; Rosanna Pansino; Worth It (by BuzzFeedVideo)
Gaming	Health and Wellness
**The Game Theorists**; The Completionist; DashieGames; PrestonPlayz; Girlfriend Reviews	**Jay Shetty**; Doctor Mike; The Fitness Marshall; Kati Morton; Prince Ea
Kids and Family	Lifestyle
**JoJo Siwa**; Chad Wild Clay; Guava Juice; The Holderness Family; The LaBrant Fam	**Bretman Rock**; Brent Rivera; Niki and Gabi; Rickey Thompson; Safiya Nygaard
News	Pop Culture
**The Philip DeFranco Show**; Business Insider Today; NowThis; Some More News; The Young Turks	**Hot Ones (by First We Feast)**; Fan Survey (by Teen Vogue); IMDb Me (by IMDb); REACT (by Fine Brothers); Sneaker Shopping (by Complex)
Science or Education	Sports
**Mark Rober**; AntsCanada; Kurzgesagt – In a Nutshell; Mind Field: Season 3 (by Vsauce); SciShow	**Donut Media**; Deestroying; Kristopher London; The NBA Storyteller; People Are Awesome
Technology	
**Marques Brownlee**; iJustine; Sara Dietschy; TechKaboom; Unbox Therapy	
PERFORMANCE
Acting	Ensemble Cast
**Brandon Rogers – Blame The Hero**; Annie LeBlanc – Chicken Girls; DeStorm Power – You Decide; Raney Branch – Black Girls Guide to Fertility; Tim Manley – The Feels	**Vlog Squad**; The Valleyfolk; The Try Guys; MrBeast; Escape the Night: Season 4
Collaboration
**David Dobrik and Kylie Jenner – SURPRISING PEOPLE WITH KYLIE JENNER!! (uploaded by David Dobrik)**; Molly Burke and Dolan Twins – Blindfolded Skydiving w/ The Dolan Twins! (uploaded by Molly Burke); PatrickStarrr and Naomi Campbell – NAOMI CAMPBELL MAKEUP TUTORIAL (uploaded by PatrickStarrr); Rebecca Zamolo and The Game Master – Network World’s Largest YOUTUBE Takeover In REAL LIFE at ViDCON! (uploaded by Rebecca Zamolo); Sofie Dossi and Matt Steffanina – 7 Rings - Ariana Grande (uploaded by Sofie Dossi)
CRAFT AWARDS
Cinematography	Costume Design
**Adam Bianchi, Andrew Ilnyckyj, Steven Lim – Worth It**; Devin Graham – devinsupertramp; Jake Koehler – DALLMYD; Josh Cassidy – Deep Look; Peter McKinnon – Peter McKinnon	**Morgan Christensen – Epic Rap Battles of History**; Brandon Rogers – Blame The Hero; Marc Littlejohn – Welcome to Daisyland; Olivia Hines – Escape the Night: Season 4; Samantha Rodes – Lindsey Stirling
Directing	Editing
**Hannah Lehmann – Two Sides**; Lindsey Stirling, Tom Teller – Lindsey Stirling; David Dobrik – David Dobrik; Brandon Rogers – Blame The Hero; Cole Bennett – Lyrical Lemonade	**Steve Grubel – Escape the Night: Season 4**; Marc Schneider, Alex "Sedge" Sedgwick, BanditRants – The Game Theorists; Emma Chamberlain – emma chamberlain; Elle Mills – EllOfTheMills; David Dobrik – David Dobrik
Writing	Visual and Special Effects
**Kyle Exum – Kyle Exum**; Thomas Sanders, Joan S., Adri White, Quil Cauchon, AJ Hentges - Thomas Sanders; Alex Ernst – Alex Ernst; Nice Peter, EpicLLOYD, Zach Sherwin – Epic Rap Battles of History; Jae Richards, Trey Richards – 4YE Comedy	**Buttered Side Down**; Aaron Benitez – Aaron's Animals; Caleb Natale – Caleb Natale; Jody Steel – Jody Steel; Kevin Parry – Kevin Parry

=== Brand Awards ===
The second annual Streamys Brand Awards were presented at a separate event hosted by Emile Ennis Jr. at NeueHouse Hollywood on September 11, 2019, during the IAB Digital Content NewFronts West. Winners are listed first, in bold.

BRAND AWARDS
Branded Content: Series	Branded Content: Video
**The Purple Boys** **(by Tim & Eric and Purple)**; Cold As Balls (by Old Spice); Road to Wizdom (by AARP and Washington Wizards); Will It Clog? (by Liquid-Plumr and VAT19)	**Snoop Dogg x NikkieTutorials** **(by Marc Jacobs Beauty, Snoop Dogg and NikkieTutorials)**; Jurassic World as a Chain Reaction Machine (by Jurassic World and WatchMojo); Michelle Khare: Challenge Accepted: I Tried Marine Bootcamp (by United States Marine Corps); Rabbit Hole (by HTC Vive and FaZe Clan); The Try Guys Try 13 Future Technologies At Google (by Google I/O and The Try Guys)
Honorable Mentions: HearMeOut (by Cricket Wireless, OUST Creative Agency and Max Borges Agency); Guilty Party: History of Lying (by AT&T Hello Lab and Fullscreen); Pet Friendly (by VCA, Refinery29 and Observatory); Warriors of the West (by Coors Banquet, UPROXX, Connect and Publicis Media)	Honorable Mentions: Hot Cizz (by G Fuel and FaZe Clan); Stephen Curry Belts Out "Hamilton" with Daughters Riley and Ryan (by Infiniti, Unanimous Media and Portal A)
Emerging Platform	Influencer Campaign
**Jimmy Fallon 'Tell Me A Joke'** (by Amazon Alexa and Jimmy Fallon); #findyourmagic (by The House with a Clock in Its Walls); Smule Duet with Natasha Bedingfield (by The Hills: New Beginnings, Smule and Natasha Bedingfield); Tasty by eko (by Walmart and BuzzFeed); WrestleMania Kickoff (by WWE)	**#MyTruth #MyCalvins** **(by Calvin Klein)**; Chipotle + David Dobrik (by Chipotle and David Dobrik); David Dobrik x SeatGeek: Becoming a Member of the VlogSquad (by SeatGeek); Look, there's no reason not to use Honey (by Honey); Ryan's World x Colgate (by Ryan's World and Colgate)
Honorable Mentions: #DreamBigVolumeChallenge (by Marc Anthony); John Wick: Chapter 3 – Parabellum Top Reactions (by John Wick: Chapter 3 – Parabellum, Lionsgate and Stardust); NBA Game Changers (by Express and Twitch); She-Ra Launch (by She-Ra, Dreamworks TV and AvatarLabs)	Honorable Mentions: Launch of Apex Legends (by Electronic Arts and Branded Entertainment Network)
Social Good Campaign	Brand Engagement
**Teens React to Texting and Driving (Distracted Driving)** **(by AT&T and REACT)**; Because of You (by Ad Council and Brat); Finding Home in America (by Zillow and ATTN:); Generation Good (by Cheerios and Ellen DeGeneres); Let's Talk About Turbans (Gasp!) (by We Are Sikhs and Funny Or Die)	**Chipotle + David Dobrik**; #FindMyiD (by Clinique and Black Tomato); Barbie – Mattel Digital Engagement Group (by Mattel Television, Fullscreen, Rainmaker Studios and Dreamworks TV); Becoming a Member of the VlogSquad (by SeatGeek and David Dobrik); Peace Props (by PeaceTea and EpicSignal)
Honorable Mentions: Chuggin' on Clouds (Music Video) (by Truth, CollegeHumor and Sawhorse); MTV's +1 the Vote (by MTV); Undercover Lyft with Chance the Rapper (by The New Chance Fund and Lyft Entertainment)	Honorable Mentions: Instagram Search Party for Emily Nelson (by A Simple Favor, Lionsgate and PopShorts); Nike "Just Do It" Pep Talks (by Nike and C+C; We Love the Earth (by Verizon Media, Lil Dicky, Nigel Tierney, Dirty Burd, RYOT, SB Projects, Iconic Engine, Leonardo DiCaprio Foundation, Sacks &Co. and 3DAR)

=== Purpose Awards ===
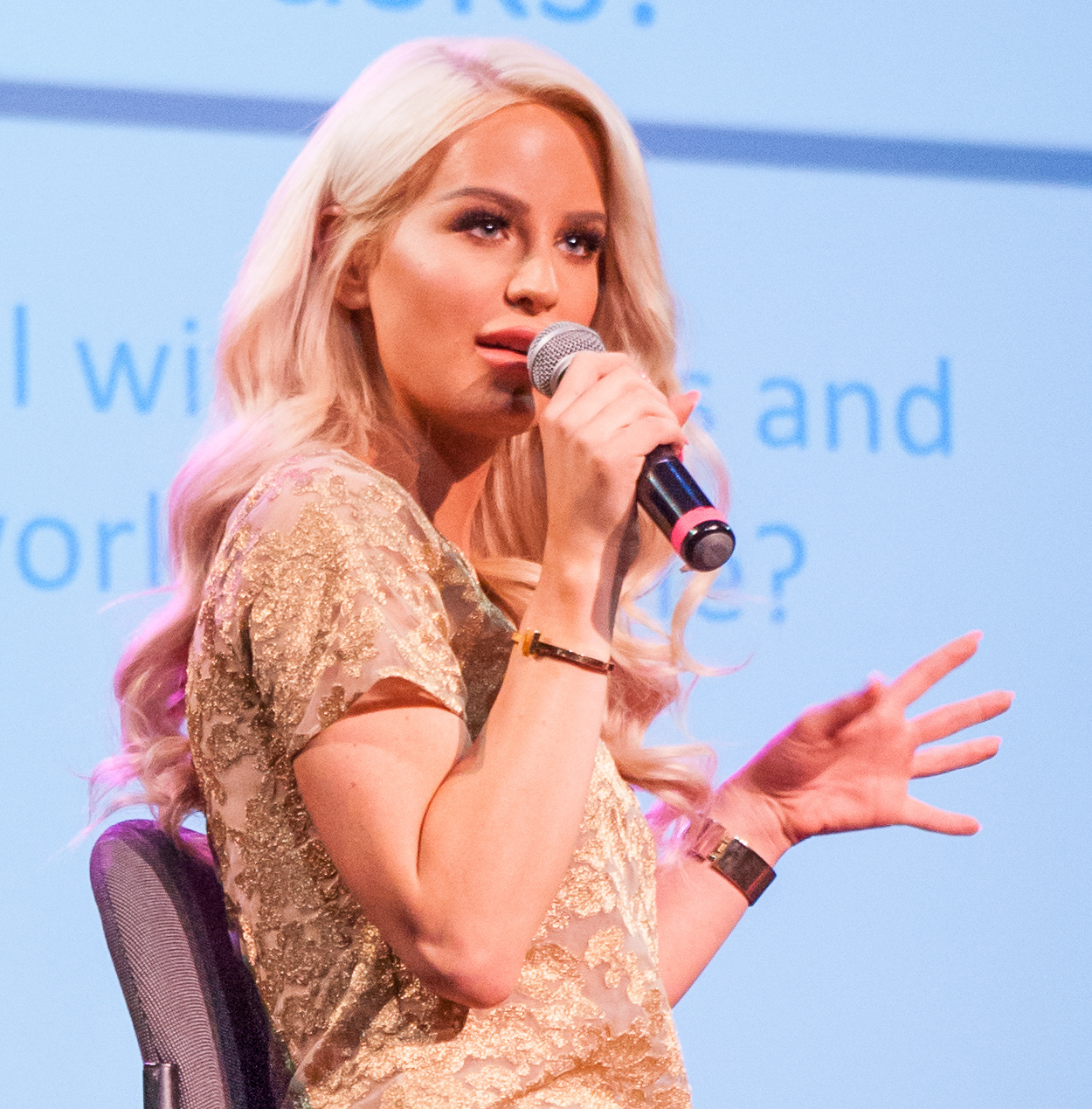
Gigi Gorgeous, winner of the Uniter Award at the Purpose Awards

The third annual Purpose Awards were presented at a separate event hosted by Jay Shetty at the YouTube Space LA on December 9, 2019. They featured a performance by Savannah Outen of her song "The Hard Way" and an appearance from special guests Sam and Colby. Purpose Award honorees are listed in bold.

Creator Award	**21 Savage – Leading by Example Foundation and Juma**; **King Bach – RuJohn Foundation**; **Markiplier – My Friend's Place**
Company or Brand Award	**ATTN: & Zillow – Finding Home in America**; **Ellen & Cheerios – DiversiTEA with Naomi Wadler**; **WWE – Connor's Cure – Children's Hospital of Pittsburgh**
Nonprofit or NGO Award	**Explore.org**; **It Gets Better Project**; **St. Jude Children's Research Hospital – St. Jude PLAY LIVE**
Uniter Awards	**Gigi Gorgeous**

== Reception ==
Tana Mongeau winning the Audience Choice Award for Creator of the Year proved controversial and was criticized by other creators such as Keemstar, Jake and Logan Paul, and PewDiePie, with many believing that the award should have gone to YouTuber MrBeast who had raised $20 million to plant trees through his Team Trees initiative that year.
