= Rebecca Zamolo =

American YouTuber

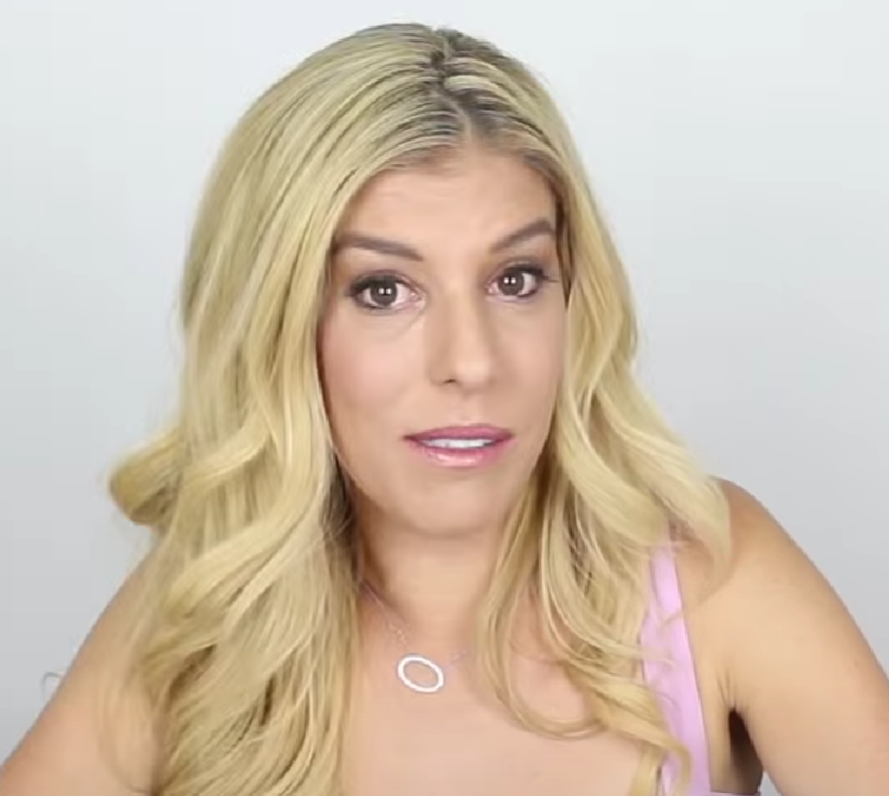
- Zamolo in 2017
- Spouse: Matt Yoakum (m. 2014)
- Children: 2

YouTube information
- Channels: Rebecca Zamolo; mattandrebecca; Game Master Network
- Subscribers: 20.0 million (Rebecca Zamolo); 3.20 million (Matt Slays); 2.94 million (Game Master Network)
- Views: 7.0 billion (Rebecca Zamolo); 2.6 billion (Matt Slays); 636.8 million (Game Master Network)
- Last updated: January 3, 2024

Rebecca Lynn Zamolo is an American YouTuber known for her Game Master Network YouTube series and franchise. She is also known for her presence on TikTok, with over 18.1 million followers as of September 2024.

== Internet career ==
Zamolo's personal YouTube channel is focused on challenge, DIY, dancing and gymnastics videos. She also has a YouTube channel with her husband Matt Yoakum (better known as "Matt Slays"), which similarly features challenge video content. In 2018, Zamolo began an escape room-inspired YouTube channel and detective Alternate Reality Game series called Game Master Network (formerly The Real Game Master) which features her and Matt solving clues to defeat an antagonist known as the "YouTube Hacker". In October 2020, a spin-off endless runner video game based on the Game Master Network series was released as an app to iOS and Android, created by Zamolo and digital product studio BoundaryLA. That December, a subscription service was also released through the app which allows subscribers to gain access to exclusive content, including musical performances, behind-the-scenes clips, character backstories and Q&As, for $8 a month. Other media released in connection to the series include a YouTube musical entitled Giant Rewind Musical in Real Life and two books published by HarperCollins. In October 2021, Rebecca and Matt were signed by management firm Underscore Talent. In addition to her YouTube content, Zamolo also runs a TikTok channel.

== Personal life ==
Rebecca Lynn Zamolo was born on 28 September 1984 in Arlington, Virginia.

Zamolo is the oldest of five siblings. She was a competitive gymnast and track runner, and prior to being diagnosed with ulcerative colitis, moved to Los Angeles, California to become an actress. She was later diagnosed with the disease after experiencing symptoms of severe abdominal pain and bleeding. Her colon also showed signs of pre-cancer. In 2014, she had her colon removed. She later released a 40-minute feature documentary on Vimeo about her experiences with the disease called Inside/Out: My Battle with IBD.

She married Matthew Yoakum on 17 May 2014. In February 2021, the couple announced that Zamolo had suffered a chemical pregnancy and later a miscarriage after beginning IVF treatment. They chose to pursue IVF treatment due to her on going health battles as well as her previous colon surgery added complications to any pregnancy she will have.

In 2022, Zamolo gave birth to a daughter, Zadie. In 2025, Zamolo announced that she and her husband are expecting a second child via surrogacy. Their son Zander, was born on August 11, 2025.

== Awards and nominations ==
Year	Ceremony	Category	Result	Ref.
2018	10th Shorty Awards	Muser of the Year	Nominated	
2019	9th Streamy Awards	Show of the Year	Nominated	
2019	9th Streamy Awards	Best Collaboration	Nominated	
2020	10th Streamy Awards	Show of the Year	Nominated	
2020	10th Streamy Awards	Kids and Family	Nominated	
2021	American Influencer Awards	Content Creator of the Year	Nominated	
2022	12th Streamy Awards	Kids and Family	Won	

== Books ==
- Zamolo, Rebecca; Slays, Matt (June 10, 2021). The Game Master: Summer Schooled. HarperCollins. ISBN 978-0-06-302507-3.
- Zamolo, Rebecca; Slays, Matt (March 1, 2022). The Game Master: Mansion Myst. HarperCollins. ISBN 978-0-06-302513-4.
