= Brandon Rogers (actor) =

American actor & YouTuber (born 1988)

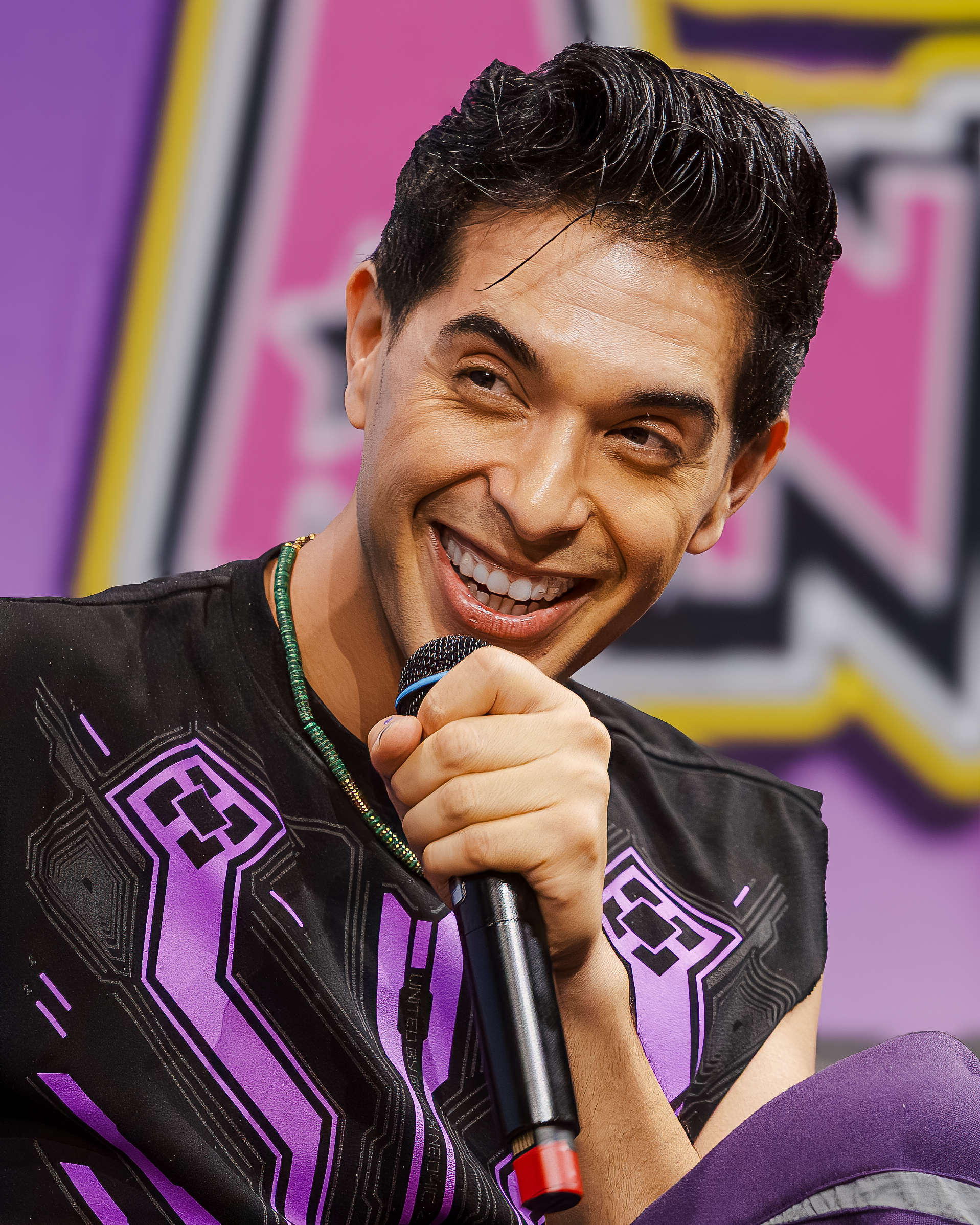
- Rogers in 2026
- Born: August 3, 1988 (age 38); Livermore, California, U.S.
- Occupations: Actor; comedian; filmmaker; Writer; YouTuber
- Known for: Magic Funhouse!; Blame the Hero; Helluva Boss; Hazbin Hotel

YouTube information
- Channel: Brandon Rogers
- Years active: 2006–present
- Genres: Black comedy; satire; sketch comedy; surreal humor
- Subscribers: 7.26 million
- Views: 1.631 billion
- Last updated: May 14, 2026

Brandon Rogers (born August 3, 1988) is an American actor, comedian, filmmaker, and YouTuber. He plays many characters in his eponymous YouTube channel and is a writer on the adult animated web series Helluva Boss, in which he primarily voices the main character Blitzø.

== Career ==
Rogers began creating videos for his job in Los Angeles at a personal injury law firm where he made documentaries that were shot by Gabriel Gonzales on the daily life of plaintiffs that were used in court. He had the idea to make humorous versions of these documentaries with Gonzales and started his YouTube channel on January 7, 2006, as "HotBananaStud." Rogers first gained recognition in 2015 when a Vine user uploaded six-second clips of his videos in uncredited roles. After a clip from one of his videos went viral on Vine and was featured on Fine Brothers Entertainment's React series, the original creator of the video became publicly known, and Rogers gained online fame.

In 2016, Super Deluxe offered to produce a show for Rogers. The show, Magic Funhouse! was available on Fullscreen's short-lived subscription service and was the service's most-watched original show. Magic Funhouse! was nominated for Best Comedy Series at the 7th Annual Streamy Awards. In 2017, Rogers was named a New Face: Creator at the Just for Laughs Comedy Festival. In addition to co-hosting the event, he was nominated for four awards and won the awards for Scripted Series and Acting at the 9th Annual Streamy Awards for his web series Blame the Hero. In 2018, Rogers was a 10th Annual Shorty Awards finalist for the Best YouTube Comedian award. Rogers collaborated with Comedy Central in 2019 for their "Under the Influencer" program which had him take over the company's social media platforms for a week.

New York Comic Con 2026 incident

On October 8, 2026, Rogers, along with the main voice cast from Helluva Boss, as well as showrunner Vivienne Medrano, were guest panelists for a portion of New York Comic Con. During the panel, an attendee began heckling the panelists, particularly during moments when Medrano, as well as Vivian Williams, were sharing personal stories. After the 4th disruption, Rogers took issue with the attendee still being there, and demanded the individual leave multiple times. This continued 2 more times afterwards, and Rogers called out security and staff for not intervening. Rogers later confirmed that staff for the event apologized to him, stating they were unsure whether his outbursts were serious or if he was joking.

== Personal life ==
Rogers is from Livermore, California, and is of Portuguese, Filipino, Scottish and Spanish descent. Brandon describes his hometown as conservative, but his parents were very liberal. His mother is an accountant and his father works for Cisco. He has two younger siblings. He is part of the LGBTQIA+ community.

== Filmography ==
Year	Title	Role	Notes
2008–present	Grandpa	Grandpa (main role) and various roles	Also writer, and director
2009–2012	Theater Class	Alex Rimmer	Also writer, and director
2013	Neighborhood Patrol	Louis Boyd	Also director, writer, and producer
2016	A Day at the Park (MILLION SUBSCRIBER SPECIAL!)	Mother (main role) and various roles	Also creator, director, writer and producer
2016–2017	Magic Funhouse!	Arlo Dittman	Also creator, director, writer and producer
2017–2018	Stuff & Sam!	Sam (main role) and various roles	Also co-writer, and director
2018	A Day at the Beach	Grandpa, Helen, Blame and various roles	Also creator, director and writer
2019	Blame the Hero	Blame (main role) and various roles	Also creator
2019–present	Helluva Boss	Blitzo and other roles (voices)	Actor, writer
2020	Blood & Makeup	Eddie Oswald and other roles	Also co-writer, director, and editor
2021	The Mismatched	Cupid	Actor
2021–2022	Normal British Series	Adrian/Lord Mingeworthy (and various others)	Also creator
2022	The Gauntlet of Gaymers	Himself	Episode "Brandon Rogers"
2023	BRYCE	Bryce Tankthrust (main role) and various roles	Also co-writer, and director
2024	Sherri	Himself	Episode "Jennifer Nettles"
2024	Bosco	Carlos	Actor
2024	Class Acts	Alex Rimmer	Also co-writer
2024	Dracula's Ex-Girlfriend	Alex	Actor
2024	Off Shoot	Dane	Episode "Ethereal Spaceship Interior"
2024–present	Hazbin Hotel	Katie Killjoy (voice)	Actor
2025	A Night at the Park	Mom, Granpa, Blitzø, various roles	Also creator, director, co-writer and editor
2026	America's Next Top Cryptid	The Jersey Bastard	Actor
2026	GodsTV	AG	Actor
TBA	Weird Party †	—N/a	Also director and writer; Post-production

== Awards and nominations ==
Year	Organization	Award	Nominated work	Result
2017	The Streamy Awards	Costume Design	Magic Funhouse! (along with Kimberly Rice and Jonathan Hinman)	Won
2018	The Streamy Awards	Best YouTube Comedian	Himself	Nominated
2018	The Streamy Awards	Comedy	Himself	Won
2018	The Streamy Awards	Costume Design	Magic Funhouse!	Nominated
2019	The Streamy Awards	Scripted Series	Blame the Hero	Won
2019	The Streamy Awards	Acting	Blame the Hero	Won
2019	The Streamy Awards	Costume Design	Blame the Hero	Nominated
2019	The Streamy Awards	Directing	Blame the Hero	Nominated
2022	The Streamy Awards	Writing	Himself	Won
2022	The Streamy Awards	Editing	Himself	Nominated
2022	The Streamy Awards	Scripted Series	Normal British Series	Nominated
2023	The Streamy Awards	Scripted Series	BRYCE	Won
2023	The Streamy Awards	Show of the Year	BRYCE	Nominated
