= Blame the Hero =

YouTube miniseries

- Promotional release poster.
- Genre: Black comedy; Post-apocalyptic; Dystopian; Science fiction
- Created by: Brandon Rogers
- Based on: Characters by Brandon Rogers
- Written by: Brandon Rogers; Adam Neylan; Jonathan Hinman
- Directed by: Brandon Rogers
- Starring: Brandon Rogers
- Country of origin: United States
- Original language: English
- No. of seasons: 1
- No. of episodes: 7

Production
- Producers: Morgan Roger; Su Jan Chase
- Cinematography: Joe Vulpis
- Editor: Brandon Rogers
- Camera setup: Single-camera
- Running time: 11-24 minutes
- Production company: TV30

Original release
- Release: March 2 – July 1, 2019

Blame the Hero is an American post-apocalyptic science fiction dark humor web miniseries created by Brandon Rogers. The series, which stars Rogers as multiple main characters, centers on street thug Blame, who is sent back in time to prevent a nuclear apocalypse. The show premiered on March 2, 2019, on YouTube, and concluded on July 1, 2019, consisting of 7 episodes. At the 9th Streamy Awards, Blame the Hero received four nominations, winning Best Actor (for Rogers) and Best Scripted Series.

== Premise ==
In 2033, street thug Sebastian "Blame" Hernandez arrives in an alternate reality where the United Kingdom has managed to conquer the world and declare world peace. Soon after, terrorist Bobby Worst nukes the planet and causes a global apocalypse, turning everyone into their worst selves. Blame is told by the Eldest Elmer that Blame himself caused the apocalypse through an unrelated chain of events that began in 1865. The eldest Elmer informs Blame that his actions have led to this moment and that he must go back in time to ensure the events never happen. However, the time machine was back at the place where he was abducted by the Society of Elmers. With the help of CEO Bryce Tankthrust, a captive of the Elmers, he successfully finds the time machine and goes back in time, while she stays behind and fends off Bobby, leading to the two of them killing each other. It's revealed earlier that a series of events in Bryce and Bobby's childhood led the latter to turn against her.

Blame begins by going back to 1865, where he stops the British couple Lord & Lady Mingeworthy from seizing control of the U.S. After that, he returns to 2018, when he was a child. As a child, he wanted a tattoo and ended up getting a gang sign. However, this led to women rejecting him, and, while "back in time", he allowed Sam, (who unbeknownst to Blame, is his future foster father), to choose an alternative tattoo. Sam is a flamboyant and colorful person, and, a Christian, decides on a tattoo reading, "I Love Jesus" with a heart. Sooner after arriving, he meets up with another version of him, who was the one who wanted to prevent the tattoo event. He lends his time machine to the original Blame so that he can go back to 2033, while he stays behind to relive his life.

However, the apocalypse has just started once again, meaning his journey was in vain. He heads back to the eldest Elmer in a bunker. There, he is betrayed by Elmer after revealing the whole plot was only to stop Worst from nuking the planet so Elmer could use a chemical weapon to turn everyone on Earth into Elmers. After killing the eldest Elmer for betraying him, he goes to find the time machine, and in the process kills multiple Elmers. He opens the time machine and prompts it to go back to when it was created. However, an Elmer gets possessed by the eldest Elmer and gets a hold of it and ended up being the one taken back in time with Blame.

Both are transported to Germany in 1942. Blame meets a crew of American assassins attempting to kill Hitler. Elmer finds the place where Hitler and two "associates" are and is greeted with much joy by Hitler. These associates are, unknowing to Hitler, 2 of the assassins. Elmer warns Hitler that Blame has come to kill him before his birthday party, leading to stricter security. Blame and an assassin get into a confrontation, with the assassin proposing Blame could want to kill Hitler just to be the only person with time travel. However, Blame denies this and invites the assassin to smoke marijuana with him.

The assassins plan the raid on his birthday party; the 2 assassins who befriended Hitler will be inside and will give a signal for Blame and another assassin to kill the 2 guards, and enter once finished. An assassin takes the waiter's clothes, and they poison the cake. The assassin brings the cake to Hitler, however, Hitler recognizes they are not the same person. The assassin denies this and tries to leave, but Elmer smells marijuana coming from the assassin and shoots him. Punchler, an assassin who befriended Hitler, reveals he was a spy for an unknown reason. He is shot and dies, and Kickler, the other friend of Hitler, attempts to shoot Hitler, but shoots and kills his mother and father.

Elmer searches the kitchen for Blame, finding him behind a table. Blame throws a can next to Elmer to distract him, and then throws another directly at him. Outside, Kickler has Hitler at gunpoint, and his wife and dog show up with guns. She shoots both but is overpowered by Hitler, who takes off her wig to reveal she is not blonde before killing her. In the kitchen, Blame is overpowered and on the ground, and Hitler attempts to shoot him but has no bullets left. Because Blame is overpowered, he summons Abraham Lincoln from the time machine, right before he cures cancer. Because he summoned him, the time machine was on the ground, and a fight between Elmer and Blame ensues. Lincoln and Hitler join in the fight on the sides of Blame and Elmer, respectively. The time machine is hit against a wall in the scuffle and malfunctions, sending Hitler and Lincoln to when Tankthrust proposed to Worst. They intervene just at the point where Worst vomits on Tankthrust's heart, leading to the apocalypse. Worst takes Tankthrust's knife and stabs Hitler, believing it would make his dad proud. However, his dad is unenthusiastic and leaves to change identities, ashamed of his son. This leads Tankthrust to not need a heart, where she says she learned she didn't from Hitler's, "How to Rule A Nation of Stupid People".

Lincoln returns to the fight with the time machine and is stabbed by Elmer, who was attempting to stab Blame. Blame stabs Elmer in the stomach, and Elmer goes down. Blame kneels next to him, and Elmer asks if Blame is afraid of death, to which he says, "When I die, I'm going to hell for life." Elmer replies by shooting him in the head, assumedly killing him. Elmer declares victory and picks up the time machine to go back to the present. However, right before finishing his sentence, he vomits blood, and realizes the knife Blame stabbed him with was poisoned. Lincoln, believed to have been poisoned as well, realizes the knife was not poisoned.

In a hospital room, two assassins stand next to him, revealing in dialogue he is still alive, but likely would have a very altered memory if left alive. One assassin asks the other her name since the war is over. The one who asked reveals her name is "Skinny Bitch", and the other assassin reveals herself as "Donna Phitts", Blame's future foster mother and husband. She is told to euthanize Blame, and she assumedly follows through on it.

Later, Donna and Skinny are seen in a field, with the former giving a eulogy for Blame. In 2020, it is announced that Tankthrust has won the U.S. Presidential Election and the British couple who made America a British nation are seen watching the television, asking what the nation would be like if they ran it, showing that Blame saved America from becoming British. Later, an Elmer is seen in a tattoo parlor, sensing someone is supposed to be there (Blame), but no one appears and he continues to tattoo young Blame. Tankthrust appears with Worst, revealing they worked together to get Tankthrust elected. Later, an old man is seen with an elderly Donna, and, in the last few moments of the episode, is seen covering his gang tattoo with his sleeve, showing that he never changed his tattoo and that he is still alive, meaning the timeline is forever fixed.

== Cast ==
=== Main ===
- Brandon Rogers as Sebastian "Blame" Hernandez / Bobby Worst / Lord Mingeworthy / Society of Elmers / Bryce Tankthrust / Various

=== Recurring ===
- Paulette Jones as Donna Phitts / Abraham Lincoln / Various
  - Alariza Nevarez portrays a young Donna Phitts
- David July (occasionally credited as David Burton) as Swallow / Various
- Dominiq Badiyo as Suck
- Logan Bubar as Blame's Friend / Various
- Kornbread Jeté as Queen's Advisor / Various
- Georgina Leahy as Lady Mingeworthy / Various
- Pulp Fictionally as Blame's Tatted Girlfriend (1)
- Adam Neylan as Adolf Hitler / Various
- Jude B. Lanston as News Correspondent / Various
- Monique Parent as News Correspondent / Various
- Joe Vulpis as Police Officer / Various
- Nandini Minocha as News Correspondent / Various
- Jonathan Hinman as News Correspondent / Various
- Annelise Jr as TV Host / Various
- Alex Diehl as Evil PE Kid / Various
- Serena Laney as Evil PE Kid
- Su Jan Chase as Evil PE Kid
- Eric Morris as Auction Party Guest / Various
- Morgan Roger as Distressed Influencer / Various

=== Guest ===
- Jinkx Monsoon as the Queen (Elizabeth II)
- Vincent Marcus as Blame's Friend
- Michael Henry as Queen's Advisor
- Jack Plotnick as Coach Best / Little Blitzbin
- Anthony Padilla as John Wilkes Booth / Duke Tugger
- Jennifer Schemke as Madam Whip and Nae Nae / Various

== Episodes ==
No. in season	Title	Directed by	Written by	Original release date
1	"The Worst Ending"	Brandon Rogers	Brandon Rogers and Adam Neylan	March 2, 2019
Street thug Blame arrives in an alternate reality where the United Kingdom has been the ruler of the world since 1865 and has since declared world peace. In a flashback to his original timeline, Blame uses a time machine to remove a childhood tattoo, resulting in his arrival to the new timeline. In the present, Blame is kidnapped by multiple Elmer-clones, who knock him unconscious and take him to meet the Eldest Elmer in an underground bunker. Once awake, Blame learns that while he was unconscious, terrorist Bobby Worst caused a nuclear holocaust, resulting in those affected by the nuclear radiation to transform into the worst versions of themselves. The Eldest Elmer explains to Blame that while Blame traveled back in time, a British couple used the time machine to allow the UK to rule the world and that those events led to the apocalypse. While Bobby Worst arrives at the bunker, the Eldest Elmer gives Blame an opportunity to go back in time to prevent the apocalypse. Blame accepts, and he is introduced to chained prisoner Bryce Tankthrust.
2	"Sassy Wasteland"	Brandon Rogers	Brandon Rogers and Adam Neylan	March 10, 2019
In a flashback, the Eldest Elmer tortures Bryce using a magic book. In the present, Bryce accepts to help Blame after learning about Bobby Worst, but requests to have the Eldest Elmer's heart in order to live. After Bobby arrives at the underground bunker, the Eldest Elmer gives up his heart (transferring his consciousness into a smartphone) and causes a distraction, allowing Blame and Bryce to leave the premises. Traveling in hazmat suits, the pair encounter a "green-asshole", a woman affected by the nuclear radiation, who the pair shoot in order to retrieve a map. Later, Bryce secretly reveals that she is helping Blame in order to kill Sam, the man responsible for making her the Eldest Elmer's prisoner.
3	"Radioactive Love Story"	Brandon Rogers	Brandon Rogers and Adam Neylan	March 20, 2019
In a flashback, a young Bobby Best falls in love with a young Bryce Tankthrust. The next day, Bryce offers her heart as a symbol for her love for Bobby, but Bobby rejects it. This causes Bryce to kill Bobby's father, and for her classmates to put the blame on Bobby. In jail, Bobby (now named Bobby Worst) promises to get his revenge on Bryce. Forty years later, Bobby escapes the prison after recruiting Suck and Swallow as his henchmen. In the present, Blame and Bryce arrive at the Cornhole Cafe to retrieve the time machine. Bobby and his henchmen arrive, and Blame kills both Suck and Swallow. As Blame travels back to 1865, Bobby and Bryce kill one another and bleed out on the floor.
4	"The United States of Britain"	Brandon Rogers	Brandon Rogers and Adam Neylan	April 4, 2019
Three days after arriving in 1865, Blame is invited to a party, where he learns that the British couple, Lord and Lady Mingeworthy, have already been in power for a whole month. In a flashback, the Mingeworthys' arrive in 1865, where they meet David Edgar Herold, who plans to assassinate President Abraham Lincoln with the help of John Wilkes Booth. On April 14, 1865, the British couple prevents the assassination of Abraham Lincoln by killing Booth. Having saved his life, Lincoln gives up the US government to the British, having learned about World War I and World War II. Meanwhile, at the party, the guests attempt to kill Blame after learning that he's a time traveler. Blame freezes time, allowing him to escape, and later time travels to the time Lincoln gave up the US government to the British couple. Blame enters the room and blindly shoots at the trio.
5	"A Botched Beach"	Brandon Rogers	Brandon Rogers and Adam Neylan	April 28, 2019
Following his entrance, Blame shoots and kills the British couple. Lincoln advises Blame to prevent the Mingeworthys' from gaining access to the time machine, and Blame travels forward in time to the year 2018. In 2018, Blame encounters the British couple, who destroy the time machine after Blame yells at them. Blame decides to look for his past-self, who is soon to arrive with a different time machine to change his childhood tattoo. After past-Blame arrives, Blame explains his situation and gains access to the other time machine. Blame travels to the present (2033), where he learns that he successfully prevented the apocalypse. Out of nowhere, a nuclear siren begins to play around the world.
6	"Thug out of Time"	Brandon Rogers	Brandon Rogers, Adam Neylan, and Jonathan Hinman	May 19, 2019
After hearing the nuclear siren, Blame quickly travels to the underground bunker. Once there, a nuclear weapon goes off, and he is restrained by the Eldest Elmer, who explains that he caused a new apocalypse after learning that Adolf Hitler created the original time machine. In a flashback, a young Elmer meets Adolf Hitler, and together, they create a nuclear weapon designed to transform all affected by its radiation into Elmer-clones. In the present, Blame escapes his restraining and shoots the Eldest Elmer, who continues to live via his smartphone consciousness. In an armory, Blame finds a copy of the time machine, and time travels back to 1942 to prevent Hitler from creating the original time machine, accidentally bringing an Elmer-clone along with him. In 1942, the Elmer-clone runs away, and Blame is found by multiple American assassins looking to kill Adolf Hitler.
7	"The Best Ending"	Brandon Rogers	Brandon Rogers, Adam Neylan, and Jonathan Hinman	July 1, 2019
In Berlin, the Elmer-clone visits Hitler to warn him about Blame. At Hitler's birthday party, the assassins set out a plan to kill Hitler. The plan goes awry, resulting in most of the assassins being shot and Blame fighting the Elmer-clone. Hitler arrives to join the fight, and Blame uses his time machine to spawn Abraham Lincoln. After a fight for the time machine, Hitler and Lincoln both time travel to Bryce's love proposal to Bobby. Hitler reveals himself to be Bobby's grandfather, and Bobby kills Hitler. Finding a book written by Hitler, Bobby and Bryce decide to stay together to rule the world. With Hitler dead, Lincoln returns to 1942 and is quickly stabbed by the Elmer-clone. After another fight with Elmer shooting Blame and Elmer bleeding out, Lincoln remains the only one alive. Blame is buried by the two remaining assassins, one of which reveals herself to be a young Donna Phitts. In the present, Bryce has become the President of the United States, the apocalypse has been averted, and Grandpa George is revealed to be an older version of Blame.

== Production ==
On January 3, 2019, series creator Brandon Rogers announced that he had been working on a seven-part series set around the end of the world. Writing took place from early 2019 to mid-May of the same year. Rogers announced via Twitter that he had started filming for the series in January 2019. Said filming took place in Los Angeles, California, with the main portion of the series being filmed in Hollywood. On January 27, 2019, Rogers posted a teaser trailer for the series on his YouTube channel, declaring that the series would come out later that year. On February 13, 2019, Rogers posted a picture on his Instagram stating that the release date for the first episode was expected to be in March. On February 25, 2019, Rogers confirmed the statement, stating that the first episode would premiere on March 2, 2019.

== Accolades ==
Year	Award	Category	Recipient(s)	Result	Ref.
2019	Streamy Awards	Scripted Series	Blame the Hero	Won	
2019	Streamy Awards	Acting	Blame the Hero	Won	
2019	Streamy Awards	Costume Design	Blame the Hero	Nominated	
2019	Streamy Awards	Directing	Blame the Hero	Nominated	
