= Bestdressed =

American YouTuber (born 1998)

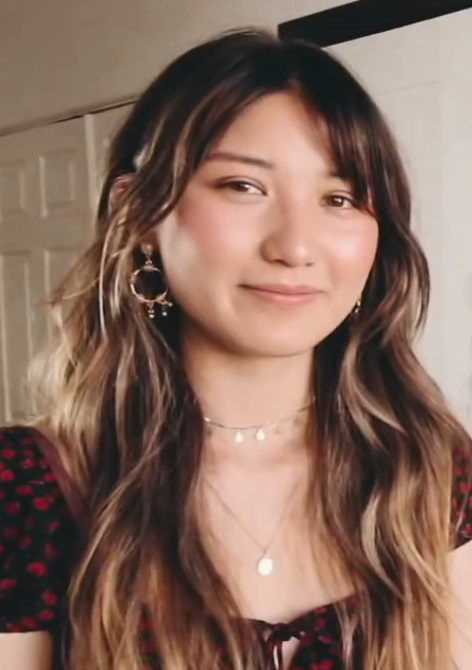
- Rous in 2019
- Born: Ashley Rous; May 4, 1998 (age 28); Ellicott City, Maryland
- Education: University of California, Los Angeles (BA)
- Years active: 2015–2020

YouTube information
- Channel: bestdressed
- Genres: Fashion; lifestyle; vlog
- Subscribers: 3.51 million
- Views: 299.5 million
- Last updated: July 21, 2026

Ashley Rous (born May 4, 1998), also known as Bestdressed (stylized in all lowercase), is an American former fashion YouTuber. Her videos also included lifestyle and vlog content and transparent conversations about sexuality and mental health. She first went viral in 2018 through her thrifting content, but left YouTube in 2020. Since, Rous began creating short films for fashion brands such as Celine, Gucci, Tommy Hilfiger, and Marc Jacobs.

== Early life ==
Ashley Rous was born on May 4, 1998, in Ellicott City, Maryland. She is a second-generation Asian-American; she is half-British and half-Burmese, although she is ethnically half-Chinese. Rous was artsy growing up and her parents had doctorates in chemistry and physics. In her family, having a YouTube channel was not positively perceived and, as of 2019, Rous had never told her parents about her channel. Rous grew up watching YouTubers such as Jenn Im and Michelle Phan and was inspired by them to pursue YouTube. She was not interested much in fashion and was a tomboy until her sister forced her to watch Project Runway, leading to her gaining an interest in thrifting after she needed something to do after she got her wisdom teeth removed.

In 2016, Rous moved to Los Angeles for college, graduating from the University of California, Los Angeles in March 2019 with a BA in film, TV, and digital media. She was also accepted into Stanford University, but turned it down to pursue film.

== Career ==
Rous created her YouTube channel in 2015, when she was in her senior year of high school. Before getting into fashion, she had previously started other channels, which included a pipe cleaner animation channel and a stand-up comedy channel, but they have since been deleted. After two years of consistently uploading, she had only reached a thousand subscribers and an average of ten views on her videos. She had also made a business of reselling thrifted clothes online, which initially started as a side hustle on Poshmark and Depop. She later created her own website to do so. Rous had also gained experience by editing for the YouTube channel The Sorry Girls until she quit to focus on her own content. She began gaining popularity in 2018, when one of her thrift haul videos reached 200,000 views, leading to her gaining 25,000 subscribers.

Rous stopped uploading to YouTube in December 2020, with her last video being an apartment tour where she mentioned that she was dealing with a stalker. Ella Porteous of The New Feminist also attributed Rous' leave to negative comments about her taking an Amazon sponsorship and her candor with sex. Porteous also noted criticism of her on snark subreddits. After leaving YouTube, she began creating short films and Reels for fashion brands such as Celine, Gucci, Tommy Hilfiger, and Marc Jacobs. In 2022, she attended that year's CFDA Fashion Awards and wore a vintage Dior gown.

== Awards and nominations ==
Year	Award	Category	Result	Ref.
2019	Shorty Awards	Breakout YouTuber of the Year	Nominated	
2019	Streamy Awards	Fashion	Nominated	
2020	Streamy Awards	Fashion and Style	Nominated	
