= Joana Ceddia =

Canadian YouTuber (born 2001)

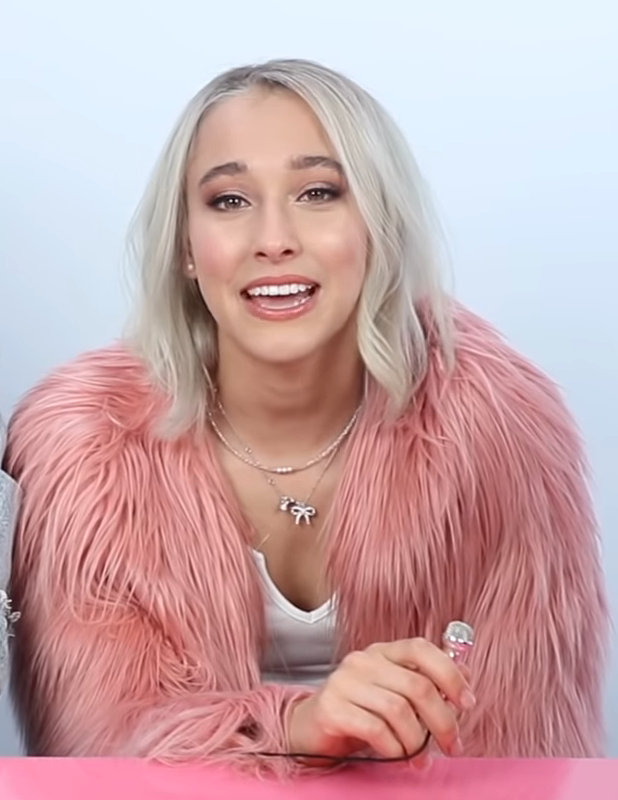
- Ceddia in 2019
- Born: Joana Campos Ceddia; June 21, 2001 (age 25); Rio de Janeiro, Brazil
- Occupation: YouTuber; (former)

YouTube information
- Years active: 2018–2021
- Genre: Comedy
- Subscribers: 3.28 million
- Views: 321 million
- Last updated: August 13, 2021

Joana Campos Ceddia (Brazilian Portuguese: [ʒuˈɐnɐ ˈkɐ̃pus ˈsɛdʒi.ɐ]; born June 21, 2001) is a Canadian YouTuber and vlogger. A nominee of a Streamy Award and a Shorty Award, Ceddia is known for her quirky and ironic sense of humor, and is famed for her work on YouTube targeted towards teenage audiences.

== Early life ==
Joana Campos Ceddia was born on June 21, 2001, in Rio de Janeiro, Brazil, to Denilce Campos, a former professional gymnast, who represented Brazil at the 1980 and 1982 South American Artistic Gymnastics Championships, winning gold in team all-around both times, and Rolando Ceddia, who is currently an associate professor at the School of Kinesiology & Health Science at York University. As of 2019, Ceddia resided in Toronto, where she was reportedly studying physics and astronomy.

== Career ==
Ceddia participated in competitive school swimming and is an OFSAA gold medalist. After suffering an injury that prevented her from pursuing a career in competitive running, she created her YouTube channel in 2018, initially uploading videos of her creating artwork. She then received recognition for her video where she attempts to cut her own hair with craft scissors, which gained over 13 million views prior to its deletion.

Ceddia then became an internet sensation, gaining nearly two million subscribers in the space of a few months. She had been faced with controversy in 2018, being accused on platforms such as Reddit of buying her subscribers due to the abnormal rate of growth she had been receiving on her channel, although it has been disproven statistically.

While she was active, her most notable content included recreating popular artwork, making vlogs and jokingly "transforming" herself into popular characters and public figures by creating costumes. For her work, she was a finalist for the "Best YouTube Comedian" category at the Shorty Awards in 2018, and was nominated for the "Breakout Creator" category at the 2019 Streamy Awards. As of July 2021, her YouTube channel had accumulated 3.28 million subscribers and 316,388,216 views from her videos collectively.

On October 30, 2021, Joana had deleted her Youtube channel, alongside her Instagram account without any announcements. Prior to deleting all of her platforms, in her final vlogs Joana mentions that she had been suffering a severe case of Topical steroid withdrawal (TSW). Ultimately between the pandemic, her health, and the irregular upload schedule because of her TSW - she dropped YouTube to focus on recovery.

In a video titled "I've been lying to you all for the past 6 months lol" originally posted on February 3, 2021, she described having periods where it would be bearable and then unbearable. At one point in the video, Joana states "I had to drop out of university because of this, I'm too tired to keep up ... My life has been pretty much just put on hold."

== Awards and nominations ==
Year	Award	Category	Result	Ref(s)
2019	Shorty Awards	Best YouTube Comedian	Nominated	
2019	Streamy Awards	Breakout Creator	Nominated	
