= Safiya Nygaard =

American YouTuber

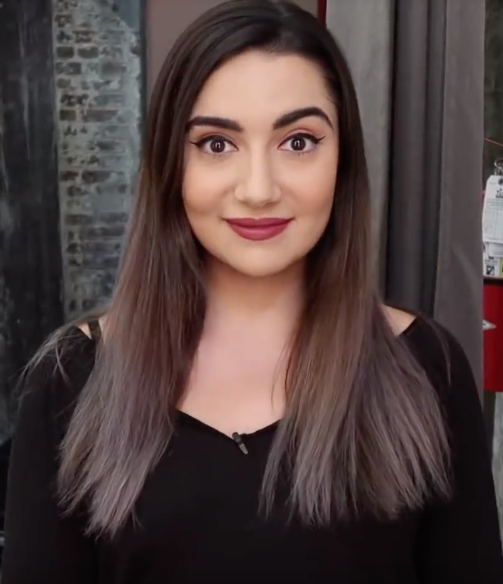
- Nygaard in 2018
- Born: Safiya Jaffer Nygaard; July 16, 1992 (age 34); Santa Clara, California, U.S.
- Education: Whitney M. Young Magnet High School; Stanford University
- Occupation: YouTuber
- Spouse: Tyler Lee Williams (m. 2019)

YouTube information
- Channels: Safiya Nygaard; Safiya & Tyler; Safiya Shorts
- Years active: 2014–present
- Genres: Beauty; science; fashion; travel
- Subscribers: 10.2 million (main channel); 11.8 million (combined) (Note: Subscribers, broken down by channel: 10.2 million (Safiya Nygaard); 578 thousand (Safiya & Tyler); 1.08 million (Safiya Shorts))
- Views: 2.18 billion (main channel); 2.7 billion (combined) (Note: Views, broken down by channel: 2.185 billion (Safiya Nygaard); 43.42 million (Safiya & Tyler); 536.4 million (Safiya Shorts))
- Last updated: April 4, 2026

Safiya Jaffer Nygaard (born July 16, 1992) is an American YouTuber and social media personality. She first gained prominence through her work with BuzzFeed on the series LadyLike. She later launched her own YouTube channel and is now known for her solo content, such as her “Bad Makeup Science” series.

== Early life ==
Nygaard was born in Santa Clara, California to Danish father Niels Nygaard, who is a university math professor, and Indian mother Mumtaz. She has a younger brother named Adil Nygaard. She was raised in Chicago, where she attended Whitney M. Young Magnet High School until 2010. Upon graduating, she entered Stanford University, where she completed a Bachelor of Arts degree in Drama and English.

== Career ==
Nygaard was hired by BuzzFeed in April 2015 and worked as a video producer for the show LadyLike before leaving the company in January 2017. She explained her reasoning for this decision in a popular 2017 video posted to her YouTube channel, titled "Why I Left BuzzFeed", which had over 14.9 million views as of April 2017.

Nygaard is known for her YouTube series "Bad Makeup Science" in which she has mixed together large quantities of various cosmetics, such as all of her liquid lipsticks, foundations, eye shadows, highlighters, and every lipstick from Sephora (among others), to create "Franken" products. Nygaard is often credited with beginning a YouTube trend of mixing large quantities of a single type of beauty product together. She has also made several fashion-related videos, including wearing strange or novelty clothing items such as clear plastic pants, 9-foot-long jeans, and thigh-high Ugg boots. She has also created videos exploring historical fashion, including one produced in collaboration with Colonial Williamsburg.

In October 2019, Nygaard released a lipstick collection in collaboration with ColourPop. In 2022, she signed with the management company Night. According to Cosmetify, she was the highest-earning beauty influencer in 2022. In 2023, Nygaard collaborated with Cristine Rotenberg's nail polish brand, Holo Taco, to release a limited edition collection of nail polish.

== Personal life ==
Nygaard is married to YouTube collaborator Tyler Williams. Several YouTubers, including Jenna Mourey (Jenna Marbles) and Cristine Rotenberg (Simply Nailogical), attended Nygaard and Williams' wedding in late 2019.

In 2015, Nygaard and Williams adopted a stray cat named Crusty. Nygaard described him as a prominent part of her YouTube channel. Crusty died in late 2021 due to old age. Nygaard uploaded a video to her YouTube channel, entitled “Our Ancient Street Cat Passed Away”, as a tribute to Crusty on April 2, 2022. The video detailed Crusty’s life with Nygaard and Williams up until his death. They adopted another stray kitten, whom they named Cosmo, a few months later.

In 2019, Nygaard and Williams bought a house in Studio City, Los Angeles for $2.9 million, which they sold in 2021 to actress Uzo Aduba for $3.1 million. Nygaard and Williams temporarily moved to Philadelphia in early 2021 before permanently relocating to Raleigh, North Carolina that February.

== Filmography ==
=== Television ===
Title	Year	Role	Notes	Ref.
Escape the Night	2018	The Investigative Reporter	Main role	

== Awards and nominations ==
Award	Year	Category	Result	Ref.
Streamy Awards	2018	Beauty	Nominated	
Streamy Awards	2018	Creator of the Year	Nominated	
Streamy Awards	2019	Creator of the Year	Nominated	
