= Magic Funhouse! =

- Genre: Comedy drama; Dark comedy
- Created by: Brandon Rogers
- Written by: Brandon Rogers
- Directed by: Brandon Rogers
- Starring: Brandon Rogers; Jess Weaver; TJ Smith; Elise Christian; Alex Diehl; Nandini Minocha; Jude B. Lanston
- Composer: Jeffrey Lynn Gowins
- Country of origin: United States
- Original language: English
- No. of seasons: 2
- No. of episodes: 14

Production
- Executive producer: Brandon Rogers
- Producer: Karla Carnewal
- Cinematography: Gabriel Gonzalez
- Editors: Ben Seegar; Zach Gouz; Jose Jimenez; Chris Smith; Shane Hackett; Andrew McGivney; Nick Smith
- Camera setup: Single-camera
- Running time: 18–30 minutes
- Production companies: Fullscreen; Super Deluxe

Original release
- Network: Fullscreen
- Release: December 15, 2016 – September 28, 2017

Magic Funhouse! is an American black comedy web series created by Brandon Rogers. The series stars Rogers as Arlo Dittman, the host of a children's television show called Magic Funhouse!, and Jess Weaver as Dave Rowland, the new production assistant on the show.

Announced on June 7, 2016, the first season premiered later that year on December 15, 2016, on Fullscreen, and concluded on January 19, 2017. That same year, the series was renewed for a second season, which premiered on August 24, 2017, and concluded on September 28, 2017. Following the removal of streaming services on Fullscreen, the series was canceled in 2018.

== Premise ==
Magic Funhouse [is] a series that peeks behind the curtain of a public access children's TV show to reveal the offensive lives of the cast and crew when the cameras are off.

— Brandon Rogers

== Cast ==
=== Main ===
- Brandon Rogers as Arlo Dittman, the host of Magic Funhouse! who portrays Mr. Marble on the show
- Jess Weaver as Dave Rowland, the production assistant of Magic Funhouse!
- TJ Smith as Cliff, a porn actor who portrays Officer McSafety on Magic Funhouse!
- Elise Christian as Sacha, a wannabe-singer and actress on Magic Funhouse!
- Alex Diehl as Jimmy, a convicted child molester and pedophile who works as the receptionist for Magic Funhouse!
- Nandini Minocha as Manjusha, the camerawoman for Magic Funhouse! and Arlo's assistant
- Jude B. Lanston as Leslie Chronis, the network head of TV30, the production company that created Magic Funhouse!

=== Recurring ===
- Paulette Jones as Mrs. Bory, a senile woman who takes care of Arlo from time to time (season 1–2)
- Monique Parent as Cordula Sweetzer, the president of HipDot Television (season 2)

== Episodes ==
Season	Episodes	Originally released	
Season	Episodes	First released	Last released
1	7	December 15, 2016	January 19, 2017
2	7	August 24, 2017	September 28, 2017

=== Season 1 (2016–17) ===
In the following list, the term "featured character" refers to the character who voices over the episode while testifying in court.

No. in season	Title	Featured character	Written by	Original release date
1	"A Broadcast of Errors"	Dave	Brandon Rogers	December 15, 2016
Dave begins his new job as a production assistant for a local low-budget kids' TV show called Magic Funhouse!, which is hosted by a demanding manchild named Arlo. On his first day, Dave messes up the show's lighting, causes chaos during a live recording of the show. To give him one more chance, Arlo proposes a system in which he will blow an airhorn in Dave's face every time he messes up. When the airhorn is empty, Dave will be fired. Dave accepts but cheats the system by replacing the airhorn when it's almost empty. On the show's broadcast day, the cameras break during the show, but Dave solves the issue by using a company computer to broadcast the episode. After the episode airs, Arlo finds out about Dave's airhorn scam, and the episode is revealed to be part of Dave's testimony in court. Arlo announces that it is his turn to testify, and the episode ends.
2	"The Long Nap"	Arlo	Brandon Rogers	December 15, 2016
At work, Arlo presents his yearly "Foster Care Special" on the show but steps off mid-broadcast after being reminded about his childhood abandonment with the word "milk". It is revealed that Arlo began to host Magic Funhouse! with the hopes of finding his parents, who left him as a child. Though the rest of the group know his parents are dead, they decide not to tell Arlo to continue working on the show. Meanwhile, Cliff throws a premiere party for his latest pornographic film, where Sacha talks to Arlo and calms him down.
3	"Mine is Harder"	Mr. Chronis	Brandon Rogers	December 22, 2016
Mr. Chronis tells the group that corporate has given them enough money to give one employee a raise. After an argument, Mr. Chronis tells the group to switch jobs for a week with someone else to see who deserves said raise. After a week, Mr. Chronis announces that he faked the raise money for his own purposes and to be allowed to wear a dress.
4	"Manjuce"	Manjusha	Brandon Rogers & Philippe Iujvidin	December 29, 2016
After her ex-boyfriend Bruce Cranberry visits the studio, Manjusha reveals to the group that she used to be on a show called Manjuce, where she and Bruce shared relationship advice on live television. After growing a relationship on the show, Manjusha proposed to Bruce on live TV but got rejected. The next day, Bruce ran away after being cursed at by Manjusha, unaware that she was singing a song containing vulgar language. Following Bruce's departure, Manjusha found and adopted a homeless Arlo, giving him his own show on TV30 after finding out about his childhood abandonment. In the present, Manjusha confronts Bruce, and the pair host a special episode of Manjuce on TV.
5	"Sex, Love and Lemonade"	Cliff	Brandon Rogers and Philippe Iujvidin	January 5, 2017
Attempting to convince Mr. Chronis to give him a raise, Cliff decides to move in with Dave to prove that he has friends. At his new home, Cliff begins to suspect that Dave is trying to murder him, only to be proven incorrect when the group reveals that they're throwing him a party to boost his morale. After the party, Arlo learns the truth about his parents when he finds their death certificates in a trash bin, also learning that the group had been lying to him the entire time.
6	"Cancelled"	Sacha	Brandon Rogers and Philippe Iujvidin	January 12, 2017
Visiting the graveyard where his parents are buried, Arlo promises to get his revenge. At the studio, Arlo attempts to get Magic Funhouse! canceled by going off-script during a live broadcast, forcing the feed to continue by holding the group at gunpoint. After the show is canceled and Arlo quits, the rest of the group decides to host a dinner theater to keep their jobs. Instead of joining the rest of the group, Dave decides to quit the show, having learned that Arlo blacklisted him from television by telling multiple TV stations about Dave's first day working at Magic Funhouse!. This results in Dave attempting to kill Arlo, only to accidentally shoot Jimmy on live TV.
7	"A Trial of Errors"	N/A	Brandon Rogers and Philippe Iujvidin	January 19, 2017
At a hospital, Jimmy manages to survive the gunshot wound but remains in critical condition. The rest of the group arrive at a courthouse, where Arlo is suing Dave for attempted murder, and where Dave is counter-suing Magic Funhouse! for psychological abuse. At the end of the trial, Dave is found guilty of all charges after Jimmy arrives at the courthouse and presents a VHS tape that includes Dave threatening to shoot Jimmy with a gun. Six months later, Dave is released from prison and returns to the studio, where he finds out Magic Funhouse! has continued to air but has since changed locations.

=== Season 2 (2017) ===
No. overall	No. in season	Title	Written by	Original release date
8	1	"Why We Perform"	Brandon Rogers	August 24, 2017
Five months prior to Dave's release from prison, the rest of the group decides to remake Magic Funhouse! as a roadshow, having convinced a hesitant Arlo to do so.
9	2	"The Farmhouse"	Brandon Rogers and Jonathan Hinman	August 24, 2017
Performing their first gig at a farmhouse in Los Banos, the group is forced to stay at the farm of a mysterious family after Sacha goes missing. Attempting to sneak out at night, the group finds out that the family is filled with friends of Dave, who attempt to murder the group. To rescue Sacha, and escape, the group is forced to kill the family. Hearing sirens, the group runs outside, where they meet Cordula Sweetzer, president of HipDot Television, who offers to give the group their own show.
10	3	"Network Television"	Brandon Rogers	August 31, 2017
In a flashback, Mr. Chronis loses his wife and daughter to the former president of HipDot Television, Mr. Longdick. In the present, the group is flown to Los Angeles after they accept an offer of having Magic Funhouse! remade on a larger network. At their new studio, the group begins to air well-rated episodes on their new show.
11	4	"Dave's Revenge"	Brandon Rogers and Gabriel Gonzalez	September 7, 2017
A few months later, Dave is released from prison, and the group is invited on a daytime talk show to discuss their recent success. During the interview, Dave is introduced as the talk show's guest, and Dave learns that Arlo was his childhood bully, who caused Dave's parents to abandon him as a child. After the group and Dave get into a brawl, Cordula reveals to the group that she planned the entire fight as a way to invite Dave as a co-host for Magic Funhouse!.
12	5	"Reality Stars"	Brandon Rogers and Stephen Weighill	September 14, 2017
After the group sign contracts to appear in a 24/7 reality television series, Cordula offers a $20,000 grand prize to the employee who writes the best script for the next episode of Magic Funhouse!. At the end of the day, the group team up and steal the grand prize.
13	6	"Behind the Portrait"	Brandon Rogers and Jeffrey Lynn Gowins	September 21, 2017
Having lost his personal dignity, Cliff decides to leave the show. Jimmy is forced to take care of Mrs. Bory, who tells Jimmy and Manjusha about her experience as a spy in World War II. In a flashback, Mrs. Bory witnesses a young Nazi girl shoot and kill her husband. In the present, the group finds out that Cordula was, in fact, the young Nazi girl, and together, they decide to kill Cordula. While planning, Mr. Chronis invites them to his wedding, where he plans to marry Cordula.
14	7	"Why We Get Married"	Brandon Rogers and Jonathan Hinman	September 28, 2017
Deciding to host the wedding at the studio, Mr. Chronis is advised by the rest of the group to poison Cordula. After he successfully poisons his fiance, Mr. Chronis is forced to marry Cordula to gain access to the rights to Magic Funhouse!. After the wedding, Cordula wakes up after surviving the poison in her body. She holds the group at gunpoint but is shot and killed by Mrs. Bory. With Mr. Chronis as the new boss, Dave returns to work as a production assistant while Arlo returns as the show's host. After a live broadcast, the group finds out that Magic Funhouse! is no longer the number one kids' show on TV, having been surpassed by the return of the hit-show, Karry's Krazy Kastle.

== Production ==
In February 2016, future series creator and director Brandon Rogers was given the opportunity to create his own TV series for Super Deluxe. While writing for the show's first season, Rogers stated that his inspiration for the series was "loosely based on an actual public access TV station that had low-budget shows to entertain the Tri-Valley locals." He also mentioned that the show was set in Rogers' home town of Livermore, California. Principal photography for the first season of the show began on May 18, 2016, and concluded on October 15, 2016. The series was mainly filmed in Hollywood. Principal photography for the second season took place between April 3 and June 13, 2017.

== Accolades ==
Year	Award	Category	Recipient(s)	Result	Ref.
2017	Streamy Awards	Comedy Series	Magic Funhouse!	Nominated	
2017	Streamy Awards	Costume Design	Brandon Rogers, Kimberly Rice, and Jonathan Hinman	Won	
2018	Streamy Awards	Costume Design	Brandon Rogers	Nominated	
