= Cristine Rotenberg =

Canadian YouTuber

Simply Nailogical
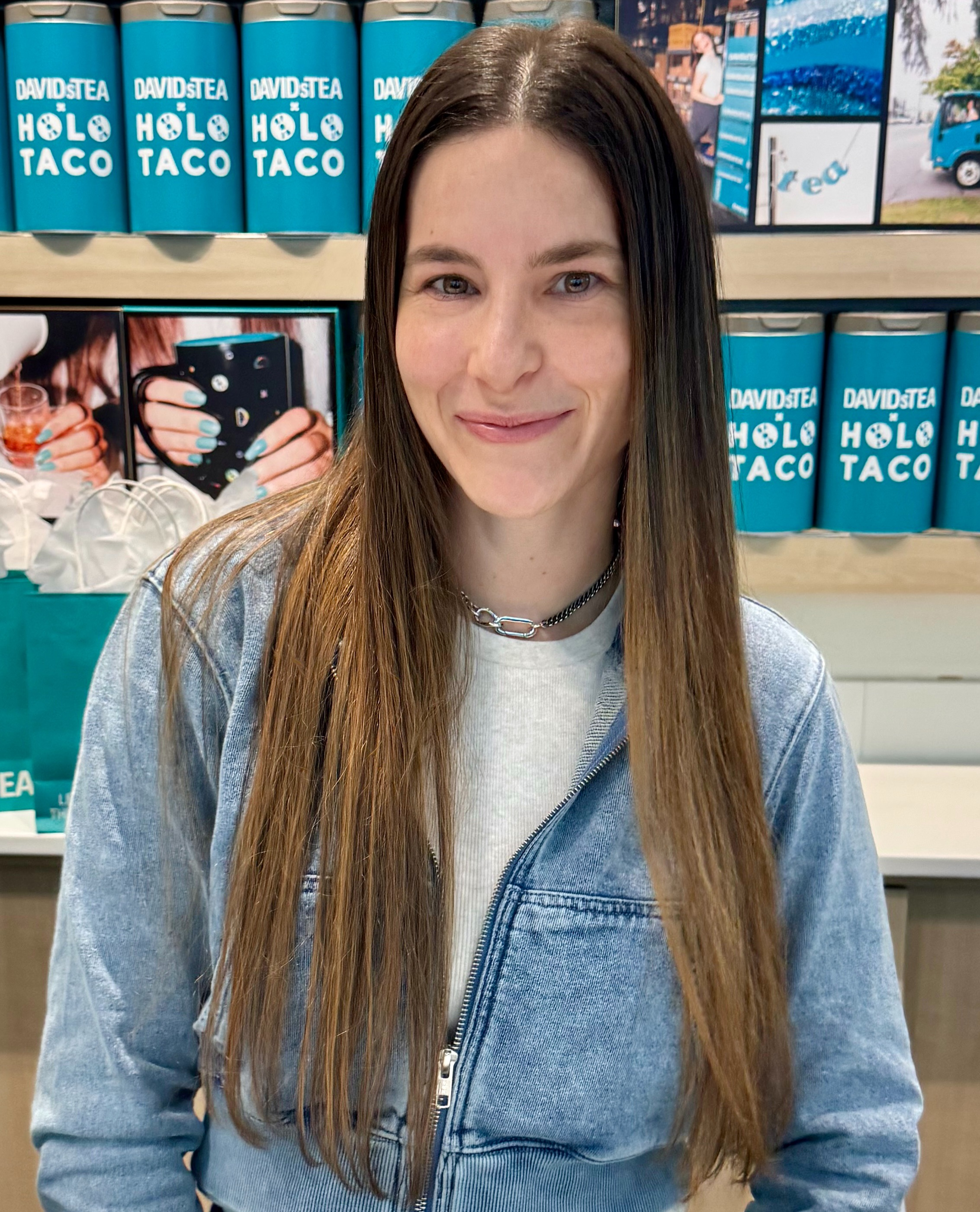
- Rotenberg in February 2025
- Born: Cristine Raquel Rotenberg; October 17, 1988 (age 37); Richmond Hill, Ontario, Canada
- Other names: Simply Nailogical; Simply Not Logical
- Occupations: YouTuber; entrepreneur
- Partner: Benjamin Mazowita (2012–present)

YouTube information
- Channels: Simply Nailogical; Simply Not Logical
- Years active: 2014–present
- Genres: Beauty; comedy; vlog; nail art; satire
- Subscribers: 7.23 million (Simply Nailogical); 2.81 million (Simply Not Logical)
- Views: 1.84 billion (Simply Nailogical); 488 million (Simply Not Logical)
- Last updated: December 23, 2025
- Website: holotaco.com

Cristine Raquel Rotenberg (born October 17, 1988) is a Canadian YouTuber and entrepreneur. She is primarily known as Simply Nailogical for her vlogs involving nail polish products and her polish brand Holo Taco.

Rotenberg ran the YouTube channel "Simply Nailogical" from 2014 to 2022, which, as of 2026, has over 7 million subscribers. She currently uploads on the channel "Simply Not Logical". In July 2019, Rotenberg launched her nail polish brand Holo Taco.

== Early life ==
Cristine Rotenberg was born on October 17, 1988, in Richmond Hill, Ontario. From 1996 to 2001, Rotenberg starred in 15 commercials for various children's products including Furby and Fib Finder, as well as an insurance commercial, and a theatrical production of Wizard of Oz. At age 13, she played the role of Young Sophia in the 2002 film Charms for the Easy Life. Following this role, she stopped taking on acting roles to focus on her schooling.

In 2014, Rotenberg received a master's degree in sociology with a concentration in criminology from Carleton University. Her master's thesis is on the topic of self-injury in prisoners as a result of prison conditions.

== Career ==
Rotenberg worked as an analyst for Statistics Canada, an agency of the Canadian government. Her work focused on crime statistics and had included analysis of sexual assault reporting amid the #MeToo movement. Despite lucrative success with her other endeavours, Rotenberg expressed her desire to maintain her analyst work for reliability and fulfillment not available in her YouTube career.

Rotenberg's Simply Nailogical YouTube channel was launched with her first video on June 18, 2014. The channel was preceded by her Simply Nailogical blog which launched in February 2014. She posted pictures of her nail art on the blog and on Instagram, and actively updated her blog until June 2016. On YouTube, Rotenberg initially created short nail art videos that were less than two minutes long. She later began extending the length of the tutorials and eventually appeared on-camera.

In June 2016, Rotenberg posted a video of herself applying over 100 coats of nail polish titled "100+ Coats of Nail Polish #POLISHMOUNTAIN". The video quickly went viral, and influenced other YouTubers such as Jenna Marbles. The Daily Dot called it one of 2016's most popular video trends. Soon after the video was posted, her subscriber count doubled. Her video was featured in the Fine Brothers's College Kids React series in August 2016. The following year, J-14 magazine described her as "the face of nail art in the internet world". In 2018, Rotenberg collaborated with F.U.N. Lacquer on a nail polish collection. Rotenberg has since branched out from nail art tutorials to videos about other topics, and in April 2019, Rotenberg's Simply Nailogical channel was the 19th most popular YouTube channel in Canada with over 6.8 million subscribers and 1.2 billion views.

Rotenberg has three secondary channels: "Simply Not Logical" was created in September 2015 and primarily contains vlogs and live streams. The podcast channel "SimplyPodLogical" and its associated highlights channel "SimplyPodLogical Highlights" launched in early 2020. In an April 2020 episode of the podcast, Rotenberg and her partner Benjamin Mazowita interviewed Dr. Howard Njoo, the Canadian government's deputy chief public health officer, about COVID-19. The podcast was announced as going on hiatus in March 2024.

On July 17, 2022, Rotenberg announced that she would cease producing videos for her main channel in order to focus on her personal life and Holo Taco. However, she remains active on her secondary channel where she livestreams weekly.

== Holo Taco ==
In July 2019, Rotenberg launched her own nail polish brand called Holo Taco. She began brainstorming for the business in 2017 and started prototyping polishes in 2018. The name of the brand stems from her consistent use of holographic top coats of nail polish in YouTube videos and viewers misunderstanding her pronunciation of "top coat" as "taco". The original Holo Taco launch contained three silver holographic top coats in addition to two opaque polishes ("One Coat Black" and "Royal-Tea Blue"). The collection sold out within two hours. Holo Taco has since released numerous nail polish collections, including collaborations with the YouTubers Julien Solomita and Safiya Nygaard. In October 2024, selected polishes from the brand began being sold at Ulta Beauty in the United States.

Rotenberg's aim with Holo Taco is the creation of high-quality nail polishes with a special emphasis on special effects polishes, including holographic, multi-chrome, and iridescent components and finishes. Despite higher production costs for special effects polishes, Holo Taco's avowed aim is to keep prices as affordable as possible. As of 2022, Holo Taco has sold more than 1 million bottles of nail polish.

== Philanthropic work ==
Rotenberg has extended financial support to her viewers through tuition giveaways and scholarships. Her annual tuition giveaways have financed post-secondary education for viewers in her home country.

In 2021, she founded a permanent annual scholarship, the Cristine Rotenberg Scholarship for Academic and Creative Pursuits, at her alma mater Carleton University.

== Personal life ==
Rotenberg has a long term partner, Benjamin Mazowita. He often appears in her videos and was the co-host of their podcast SimplyPodLogical before it went on hiatus. The couple resides in Ottawa with their two cats, Menchie and Zyler.

== Filmography ==
Year	Film	Role	Notes
2002	Charms for the Easy Life	Young Sophia	TV movie

== Awards and nominations ==
Year	Award	Category	Result
2016	The Streamy Awards	Breakout Creator	Nominated
2017	The Streamy Awards	Best Beauty Program	Nominated
2019	The Streamy Awards	First Person	Nominated
2019	The Streamy Awards	Creator of the Year	Nominated
2021	The Streamy Awards	Creator Product (Holo Taco)	Nominated
2022	The Streamy Awards	Creator Product (Holo Taco)	Nominated
