= Savannah Outen =

American singer (born 1992)

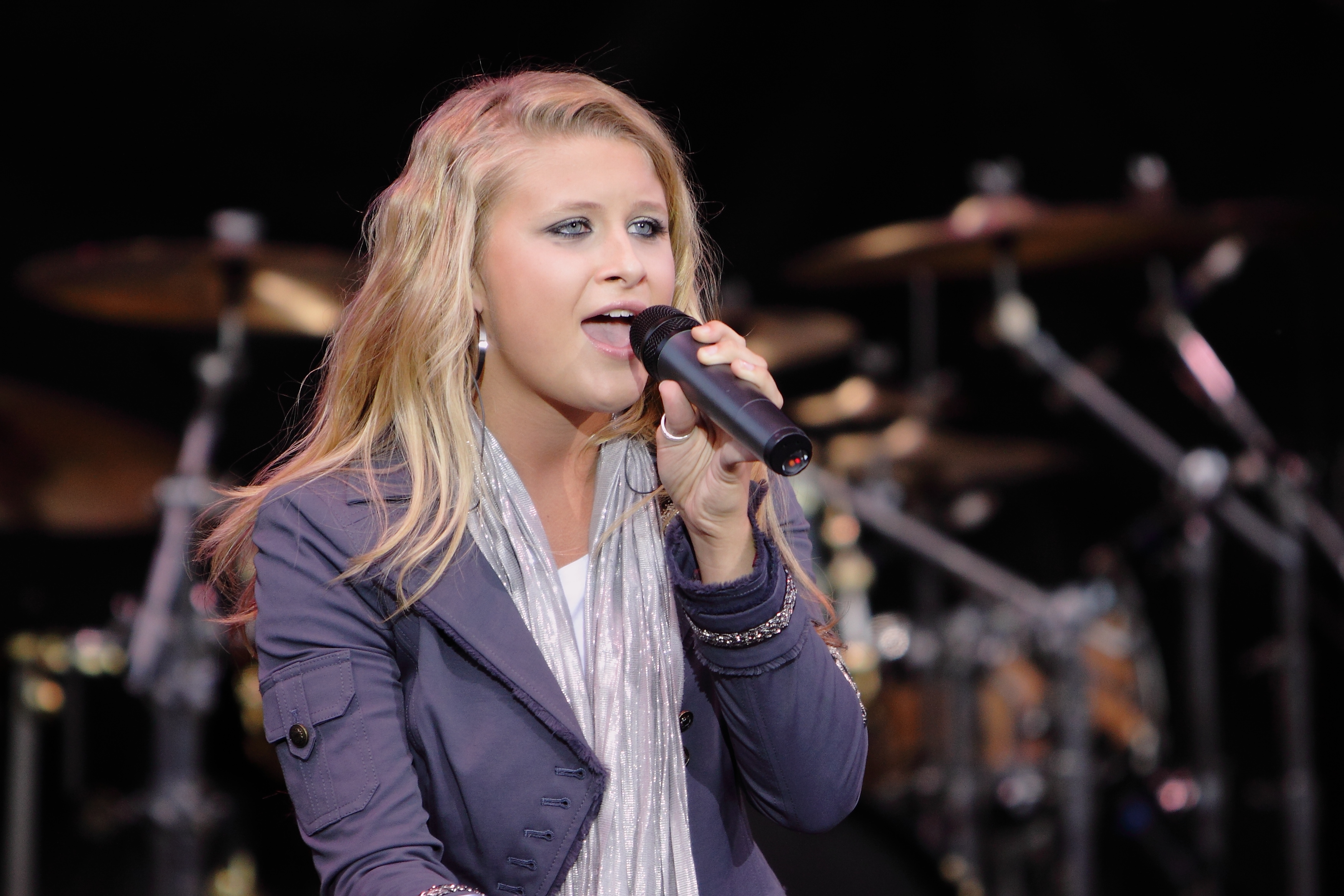
- Savannah Outen performing in 2012

Background information
- Born: Savannah Paige Outen; October 14, 1992 (age 34); Hillsboro, Oregon
- Genres: Pop rock, pop, alternative, indie
- Occupations: Singer, songwriter
- Instruments: Vocals, Piano, Guitar
- Years active: 2007 - present
- Labels: Levosia Entertainment, Vector Management, New Entertainment Company
- Spouse: Elan Sieder (m. 2024)
- Website: www.savannahouten.com

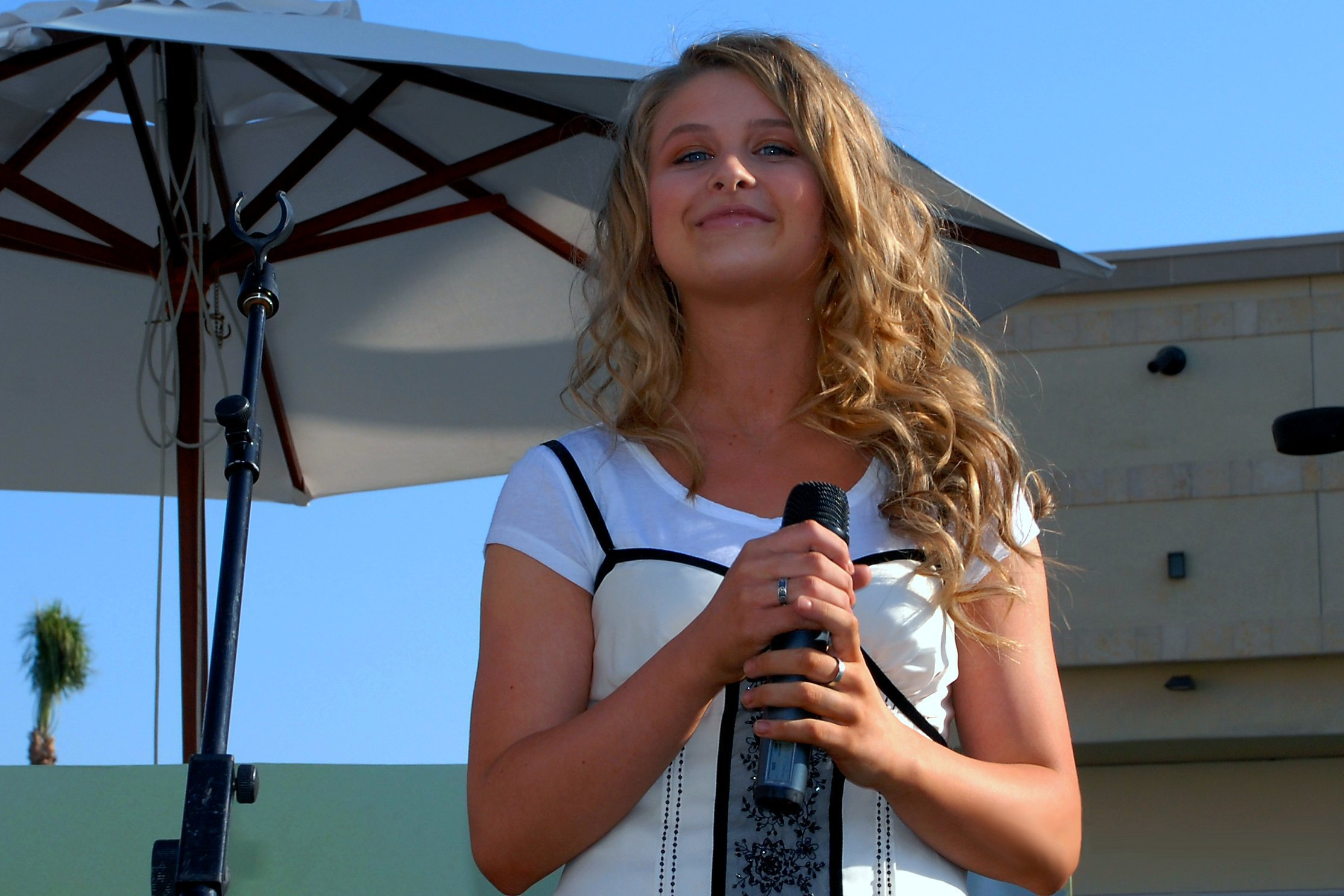
Live performance with "If You Only Knew" (May 2009)

Savannah Paige Outen (born October 14, 1992) is an American singer who gained popularity on YouTube. Outen began posting videos of herself singing on YouTube in March 2007 along with Angelika Vee and Esmée Denters. In 2010 she collaborated with Boyce Avenue on their sixth acoustic album, New Acoustic Sessions. She appeared in the 85th Annual Macy's Thanksgiving Day Parade on November 24, 2011.

== Biography ==
Savannah Outen was born on October 14, 1992, to Barry and Lisa Outen. Outen's hometown is Hillsboro, Oregon, in the Portland metropolitan area. There she attended Century High School, but was later home schooled by her parents and graduated early. At age 12, Outen made it to the finals of "America's Best New Talent".

"Goodbyes" was released in 2008 on iTunes. She wrote "Goodbyes" during her middle school graduation about a friend who was moving to a different high school from her.

"So What" and "Tell Me It's True" were recorded by a Local Producer and are in a Universal Records Music Catalog. According to her parents, they were supposed to be used as Demos for record labels. But according to her ex-manager, Keith Thomas, he received acoustic versions of 3 songs: "Goodbyes", "Unlock The Door" (later a free single at her extinct website SavannahOfficial.com) and "My Dream Is".

"Goodbyes" is on Radio Disney Jams, Vol. 11. It peaked at No. 5 on the Radio Disney Countdown, making her the first unsigned artist to reach this position at that radio station. The song also got a music video that was directed by Mason Dixon and shot in Nashville.

"Fighting for My Life" was on the Radio Disney Music Mailbag and was picked with 95% approval.

Savannah appeared in the first five Rising Stars Webshow episodes, part of the popular online Radio Disney fansite, Radio Disney Club. One out of five episodes are currently online, after the club was hacked. Savannah posted about the webshow on her Twitter page the night it debuted and two weeks later. A cover of the song "No Place Like Here" from the straight to DVD film "Quest for Zhu" (which was served as the film's theme song) can be heard on the film's official soundtrack as a Bonus Track. Savannah appeared on the Radio Disney Club on November 25, 2011, in celebration of their fourth birthday, in a follow-up interview.

Billboard's website visitors named Outen as one of the six finalists to perform at the Billboard 2012 Battle of the Bands. She performed on May 18, 2012, in the showdown alongside her competition Saints of Valory, Patent Pending, After the Smoke, Take the Day, and Doe Eye, but did not win. Outen also made a small cameo appearance in the December 2012 Judd Apatow movie This is 40.

== Music ==
Outen has been asked to sing the National Anthem at many professional sports venues, including the Oakland Raiders, Los Angeles Dodgers, Anaheim Angels, Seattle Mariners, Seattle SuperSonics, Seattle Storm, and the Portland Beavers. From 2002 to 2006 she was a member of the Junior BlazerDancers dance group. In 2006, she won the youth talent contest at the Washington County Fair in her hometown.

In fall 2007, Keith Thomas of Levosia Entertainment signed Outen to a recording and management contract. Savannah's first single from the three demo CD released by Levosia Entertainment was "Goodbyes". That song drew comparisons to Carrie Underwood and Britney Spears from MTV's Pop Cultured. Outen's first video was a cover of the song "Listen" from the motion picture Dreamgirls.

On May 31, 2008, Outen's first single, "Goodbyes", was featured on Radio Disney's Music Mailbag. She received a 95% pick and on June 2, the song was added to the Radio Disney playlist. Within two weeks, it debuted at #28 on the Top 30 Countdown, charting for 18 straight weeks and peaking at #5, making it the highest rated song an unsigned artist has ever achieved on Radio Disney. Her latest song, "Fighting For My Life", was on the music mailbag on October 31, 2009, and got a 98% pick by listeners. She reached 19 million views on her YouTube account by October 2008.

Outen removed her cover songs from YouTube on March 17, 2009, due to concerns over copyright violations but returned them a short time later.

On April 3, 2009, the music video to her second single, "If You Only Knew" was posted on YouTube. It was directed by Mason Dixon, who also directed her first music video for "Goodbyes", and starred Disney Channel's Tony Oller (As The Bell Rings) as "Cas". It has since garnered more than 4 million views. In December 2009, clothing designed by Outen for Primp Girl went on sale, with the profits from the sales given to a charity selected by Outen.

== Filmography ==
=== Film ===
Year	Title	Role	Notes
2010	Pizza & Karaoke	—N/a	TV movie
2012	This is 40	—N/a	Uncredited cameo
2015	Take A Chance	Amanda	Supporting role

=== TV series ===
Year	Title	Role	Notes
2013	If The World Was Ending	Featured Artist	TV Miniseries; Episode: "106"
2018	My Babysitter Story	Babysitter's Friend	Episode: "A Night With My Hot Babysitter"; Voice role
2018	Alex Clark: Animated Storytimes	Babysitter's Friend	Episode: "A Night With My Hot Babysitter"; Voice role

=== As herself ===
Year	Title	Notes
2011	This Week In Reality TV	Episode: "American Idol Preview"
2011	Red Carpet Report	Episode: "2nd Annual Thirst Project"
2011	Macy's Thanksgiving Day Parade	TV special
2012	Bri What?	2 episodes: "Savannah Outen Unplugged", "Savannah Outen Interview"
2012	Piper's Picks TV	Episode: "Savannah Outen Interview, Singing, and Walt Disney World vs. Disneyland at Piper's Picks Planetary HQ!"
2012	Beyond The Spotlight: Hits the Streets	Episode: "ASPCA Rock and Roll Benefit"
2016	Sing Holiday Music	Performer

== Discography ==
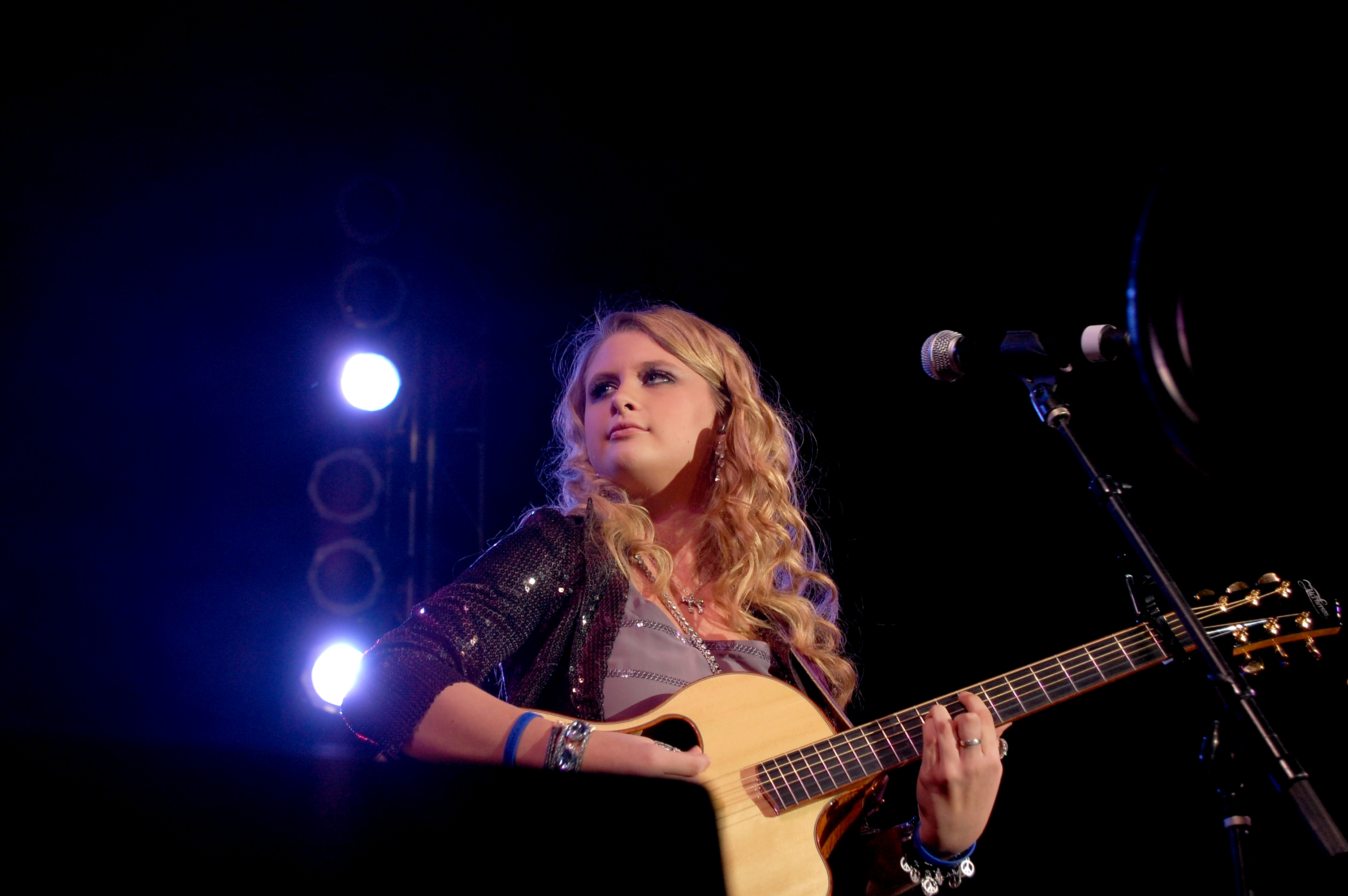
"Anthem Tree Lighting Ceremony" (November 2009)

=== Albums ===
Title	Details
Inception	Released: November 19, 2010; Label: Levosia Entertainment; Format: Digital download, streaming

=== Extended plays ===
Title	Details
Sing to Me	Released: October 16, 2012; Label: Keep Your Soul Records; Format: Digital download, streaming

=== Cover albums ===
Title	Details
The Covers, Volume I	Released: February 9, 2012; Label: Keep Your Soul Records; Format: Digital download, streaming
The Covers II	Released: June 13, 2012; Label: Keep Your Soul Records; Format: Digital download, streaming
The Covers, Volume III	Released: October 31, 2012; Label: Keep Your Soul Records; Format: Digital download, streaming
Josh Golden & Savannah Outen Covers (EP)	Released: December 6, 2012; Label: Keep Your Soul Records; Format: Digital download, streaming
The Covers IV	Released: February 25, 2013; Label: Keep Your Soul Records; Format: Digital download, streaming
The Covers V	Released: July 23, 2013; Label: Keep Your Soul Records; Format: Digital download, streaming
The Covers VI	Released: December 18, 2013; Label: Keep Your Soul Records; Format: Digital download, streaming
The Covers VII	Released: November 27, 2014; Label: Keep Your Soul Records; Format: Digital download, streaming

=== Singles ===
Year	Title	Album
2008	Unlock The Door	Inception
2008	Goodbyes	Inception
2009	If You Only Knew	Inception
2009	Hope And Prayer	Inception
2009	Fighting For My Life	Inception
2010	Be Original	Non-album single
2010	The Song of Christmas Time	Non-album single
2010	Magical Season (feat. Anna Golden)	Non-album single
2011	Tonight With You (with Josh Golden)	Non-album single
2012	Remember Me (with Jake Coco)	Non-album single
2012	Fairytales of L.A	Sing to Me
2012	Closure	Sing to Me
2013	Brave & True (for Music is Medicine)	Non-album single
2015	Boys	Non-album single
2017	Coins	Non-album single
2018	Sad in the Summer	Non-album single
2018	Shortcut	Non-album single
2018	Christmas (Baby Please Come Home)	Non-album single
2019	The Hard Way	Non-album single
2019	Have Yourself a Merry Little Christmas	Non-album single
2020	A Puro Dolor (with Lionel Ferro)	Non-album single
2020	Never Be New York	Non-album single
2020	Lonely Together (The Quarantine Song)	Non-album single
2021	What Are We	Non-album single
2021	What Are We (Acoustic version)	Non-album single
2021	Wish I Didn't Know	Non-album single
2022	Wait For the Sun	Non-album single
2022	Willow Tree (with Steve Horner)	Non-album single
2023	More	Non-album single
2023	Unlove Me	Non-album single
2025	Goodbyes (Rerelease)	Non-album single
2025	If You Only Knew (Rerelease)	Non-album single
2025	All Mine	Non-album single
2025	Speechless	Non-album single

=== Soundtrack appearances ===
Year	Album	Title
2008	Radio Disney Jams, Vol. 11	Goodbyes
2009	Tinker Bell and the Lost Treasure	A Greater Treasure Than A Friend
2010	DisneyMania 7	Little Wonders
2010	The Karma Club (Original Book Soundtrack)	Kick Her to the Curb, Can't Take It Back and Take Pity
2011	The Quest for Zhu: Music from the Motion Picture	No Place Like Here
2012	This Is 40	So What

=== Music videos ===
Year	Title	Director
2008	Goodbyes	Mason Dixon
2009	If You Only Knew	Mason Dixon
2011	Tonight With You	Joe Fahey
2011	Moves like Jagger	Jimmy Bates
2011	No Place Like Here	Jimmy Bates
2011	Silent Night	Jimmy Bates
2012	I've Got You	Julien Garros
2012	Fairytales Of L.A.	Julien Garros and Jake Coco
2013	Closure	Jade Ehlers and Wade Yamaguchi
2015	Boys	Sherif Higazy
2016	Silent Night	N/A
2017	I'll Be Home for Christmas	N/A
2018	Sad in the Summer	Roxana Baldovin
2018	Shortcut	N/A
2019	The Hard Way	Ryan Espinosa
2019	Have Yourself a Merry Little Christmas	Caden Huston
2021	Wish I Didn't Know	Spencer Sutherland and Caden Huston
2025	Speechless	Chris David
