= Rosanna Pansino =

American YouTuber (born 1985)

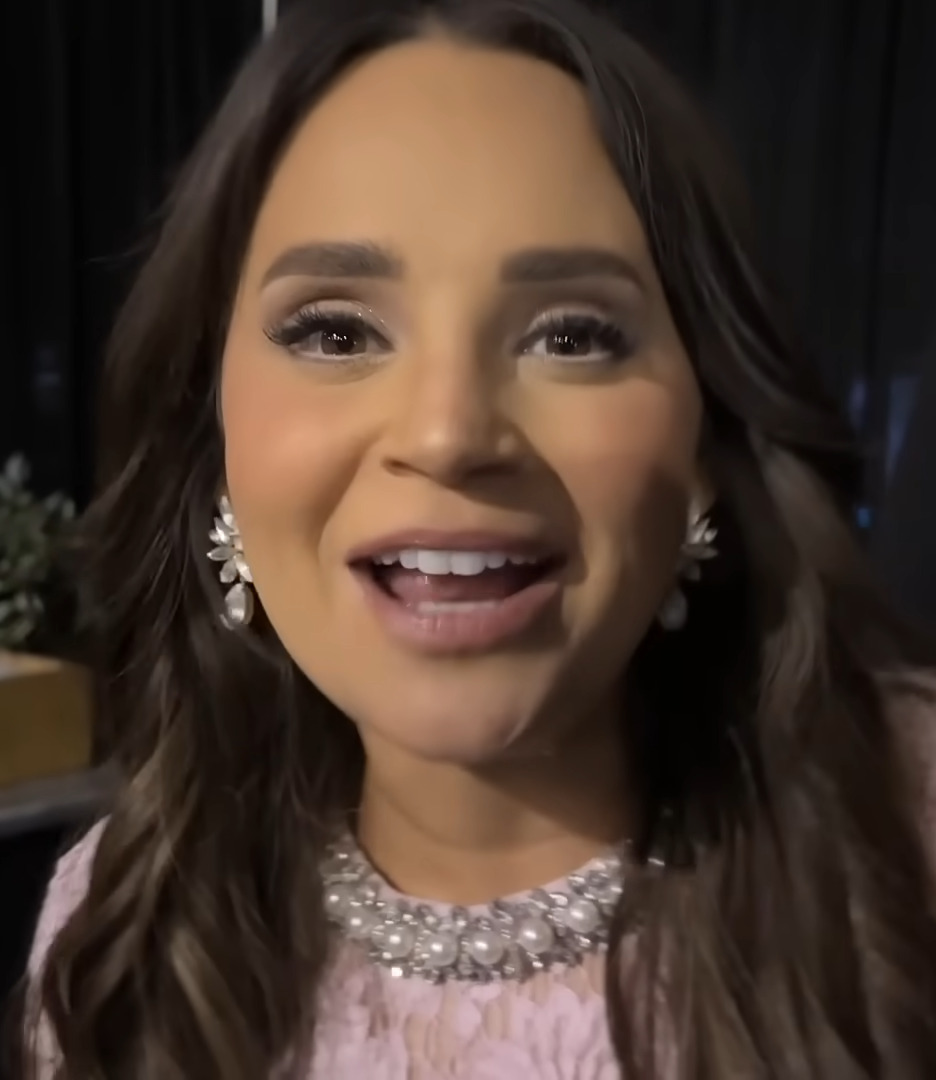
- Pansino in 2025
- Born: Rosanna Jeanne Reardon; June 8, 1985 (age 41); Seattle, Washington, U.S.
- Occupations: YouTuber; baker; actress; author; businesswoman; singer; television personality; podcast hostess
- Years active: 2008–present

YouTube information
- Channel: Rosanna Pansino
- Subscribers: 14.8 million
- Views: 5.129 billion
- Last updated: June 29, 2026
- Website: rosannapansino.com

Rosanna Jeanne Reardon (born June 8, 1985), known professionally as Rosanna Pansino, is an American YouTuber, businesswoman, gamer, and television personality. She is known for hosting her baking series Nerdy Nummies on YouTube (2011–present). She has written two cookbooks and released homeware lines based on the show. She has won a Shorty Award and been nominated for five Streamy Awards for Nerdy Nummies. She was listed first on Forbes' Top Influencers: Food in 2017.

Early on in her career, Pansino appeared in minor television roles and the reality series Scream Queens (2010); she later went on to star in the YouTube Premium series Escape the Night (2018–2019), as well as its spin off mini-series on Tubi; Escape The Night: The Lost Tapes (2026). She was also the host of the HBO Max series Baketopia (2021). She independently released her debut single "Perfect Together" in 2015.

== Early life ==
Rosanna Jeanne Reardon was born on June 8, 1985, in Seattle, Washington, where she was raised alongside her younger sister Molly Lu. She is of Italian, Croatian, German, and Irish ancestry. She was baptized Catholic. Throughout her childhood, she was known by friends and family as a "nerdy", "awkward" kid, and she struggled with dyslexia and ADHD in school. She originally wanted to become an actress, and after attending West Seattle High School and Pacific Lutheran University, she moved to Los Angeles to pursue acting. Prior to her YouTube career, Pansino worked as a teacher in China and as a Methodist church secretary.

Pansino's interest in cooking was inspired by her father and grandmother, and she stated in 2014 that "...baking has always been a hobby of mine. I have always loved being creative with my food and making themed sweets for my friends."

== YouTube career ==
Pansino began her YouTube channel in 2010 after she was encouraged by a few of her friends who also worked on YouTube, and she started making videos to get more comfortable in front of a camera. After her early baking videos gained a steady following, viewers eventually started to request more content. Because she had never seen a baking show on television or the Internet, Pansino decided to create the Nerdy Nummies series. She decided to use the last name "Pansino" online, which was her maternal grandmother's maiden name. She later revealed that in her early years of YouTube, while she was still working as an actress, she was given the ultimatum by her agent to choose between acting and YouTube. She remained adamant that she would not quit YouTube, despite the uncertainty involved. Pansino told Cosmopolitan in 2015: "At this point, I wasn't making any money on YouTube. I knew that it was possible to do that but I wasn't making a dime. I decided, I'm going to do this. I'm not going to let YouTube go."

As of April 2026, Pansino's channel has attained over 5.1 billion views and 14.8 million subscribers, making it the most popular cooking channel on YouTube. She has received several accolades. In 2013, she won the Shorty Award for Best Foodie, Chef, or Food Lover in Social Media. She has also received five Streamy Award nominations for her work on Nerdy Nummies. In 2018, Pansino officially reached 10 million subscribers on YouTube, earning her the Diamond Play Button given by the company. According to CNBC and Forbes, Pansino has remained one of the highest-paid YouTubers, reporting her to have made seven figures each year through sponsorships and advertisements. Commenting on her success in an interview with Business Insider in 2014, she stated: "I've never thought about how to make a video go viral. From the very beginning I have always wanted to use YouTube to better myself and share things I enjoy with the world. If others want to join me on that journey I am happy to have them as viewers."

Pansino has collaborated with several other YouTubers, including iJustine, the Merrell Twins, Rebecca Zamolo, and MatPat. She was among other YouTubers who appeared in MrBeast's 2021 "$1,000,000 Influencer Tournament". Pansino has since become critical of MrBeast due to allegations against him related to an unsafe work environment. In October 2024, she criticized the Lunchly kits for containing moldy cheese.

She has been noted for her consistent upload schedule, not having missed a single date since creating her channel. She stated in an interview with Forbes that "I don't want to miss an upload; I'm just not going to do that to my community, they've shown up for me and been so supportive of me, and in exchange I've been there for them—there's always going to be a video waiting for them on Saturday. It's this relationship and bond that I never wanted to break and I'm really proud that I haven't because it has been difficult at times." She has said that she hopes to "be making baking videos until I'm 90 years old." In 2021, she said in a Forbes interview "that around 60 hours of work go into a typical cooking video," due to the amount of time needed to experiment, assemble, bake, and film.

== Other activities ==
As an actress, Pansino appeared on Season 2 of VH1's Scream Queens, a reality series in which the prize was a role in one of the Saw films; she finished in 9th place. Following this, Pansino appeared in small roles on shows such as Parks and Recreation and CSI: Crime Scene Investigation. She voiced the role of Violet in the animated web series Broken Quest in 2013. In 2015, she made a cameo in the music video for "Dessert" by Dawin ft. Silentó. In 2016, she had a recurring voice role on the television series Emo Dad and also guest starred in the Disney Channel series Bizaardvark as herself. Pansino starred on the third season of YouTube Red's Escape the Night as The Jetsetter in 2018, the fourth season as The Socialite in 2019, and the later three-episode follow-up series as The Fitness Instructor in 2025. Pansino and the rest of the cast for both the third and fourth seasons were nominated for Streamy Awards. In 2023, she guest starred as a wedding planner on NCIS: Los Angeles, which she described as a "dream come true."

Pansino is a classically trained singer. She released her debut single entitled, "Perfect Together", in 2015. Produced by Kurt Hugo Schneider, it was initially released as a single on iTunes, but a music video was released later the same year; as of 2019, it has over 20 million views. She has continued to post covers of popular songs on her YouTube channel, notably of songs like "Part of Your World" from the Disney movie The Little Mermaid. Such covers, including both "Part of Your World," and "Think of Me" from Phantom of the Opera, have become available to purchase on sites such as Spotify. As an author, in 2015, Pansino wrote and published The Nerdy Nummies Cookbook. The book included selected recipes previously featured on Nerdy Nummies, along with previously featured recipes which were remastered. The book became a New York Times best seller and was listed by Book Riot as one of "50 Must-Read Books by YouTubers". In 2018, Pansino released another cookbook entitled, Baking All Year Round, which was based on the same concept of her previous cookbook.

Pansino began her business ventures in August 2017, releasing a baking line in collaboration with the bakeware company Wilton. The line consisted of cooking tools and products primarily intended for use by beginners, with items including color coding and line gauges. It was released to a number of retailers, including Walmart and Michael's. In 2018, she released new items to further extend her line. In 2022, she also collaborated with iDesign to create a kitchen and home organization line distributed by The Container Store, consisting of various items including mixing bowls, turntables, and storage containers. She began hosting in 2019, making an appearance as a guest judge on the Netflix original competitive baking show Nailed It!. In 2020, she appeared on YouTuber Lauren Riihimaki's show Craftopia. In 2021, Pansino hosted the HBO Max series Baketopia where contestants competed in a bake-off to win up to $10,000; her hosting work on the show received praise and she also executive produced several episodes. In November 2024, Pansino started her own podcast series called the "Rodiculous Podcast", where she has interviews and conversations with celebrities and fellow YouTubers, with a lot of them being her friends.

== Personal life ==
Pansino currently resides in Los Angeles, where she films all her YouTube videos. In 2018, Pansino announced her already years-long relationship with e-sports commentator Mike Lamond, better known as Husky. On August 13, 2026, Pansino announced via Instagram stories that she is single. She made allegations against her ex-boyfriend, claiming that she experienced "abusive and coercive control" from him and that a temporary restraining order had been partially granted.

On December 17, 2019, Pansino announced throughout her social media outlets that her father had died as a result of leukemia, which he had been fighting for six years.

=== Health ===
In 2019, she was admitted to a local hospital after complaining of severe pain and illness. It was later revealed that she had caught a life-threatening bacterial infection, which was treated immediately. In February 2021, she underwent a removal of her breast implants and discussed her reason for choosing to remove her implants a year later in a YouTube video.

In September 2024, Pansino posted an update on social media stating that she had been diagnosed with premenstrual dysphoric disorder (PMDD). She shared that it had been causing disruptions in her life that at times, had caused her to cancel all plans for weeks and that her symptoms had sent her to the emergency room twice. She also mentioned that she was working with a hormone specialist for treatment. In September 2025, Pansino posted an update on Facebook that her symptoms of PMDD were worsening to the point of causing disruptions in her daily life. As part of her post, she stated, "Recently, my own PMDD symptoms have gotten much worse and it has completely disrupted my ability to have a normal life. I am working with professionals to get onto a new treatment plan." She also posted that she was going to take a break from social media to focus on her treatment and that she intended to make an educational video on PMDD.

In June 2025, Pansino posted on social media that she had a benign tumor removed from her clavicle after finding the growth the previous year and having undergone an inconclusive biopsy. On June 13, 2026, Pansino slammed her jaw into a boat dock attempting to disembark a chartered boat during her birthday party, breaking her jaw and several teeth and requiring an implanted plate along her chin to re-solidify her jaw.

On September 10, she shared that she had been sober over the previous two months, and had quit taking "unnecessary medications" with advice from her doctor.

== Filmography ==
=== Film ===
Year	Title	Role	Notes
2010	Star Trek: Phoenix	Ensign Kelly	Short film
2019	A Heist With Markiplier	Professor Beauregard	Interactive web film
2022	In Space With Markiplier	Professor Beauregard	Interactive web film
2025	Escape the Night: The Lost Tapes	The Fitness Instructor	Tubi miniseries (Escape the Night conclusion)

=== Television ===
Year	Title	Role	Notes
2008	Scream Queens	Herself	Game show; 2 episodes
2009	Parks and Recreation	Holiday Elf	Episode: "Christmas Scandal"
2010	Warren the Ape	Lela Finkelbaum	Episode: "Out with the Old"
2010	Glee	Cheerio Cheerleader	Seasons 1–2
2011	CSI: Crime Scene Investigation	Cheerleader	Episode: "Unleashed"
2013	Broken Quest	Violet	Main voice role
2016	Bad Internet	Chef Sarah	Episode: "Death Battle Showdown"
2016	Emo Dad	Miss Blissful	Recurring voice role
2016	Bizaardvark	Herself	Episode: "Agh, Humbug"
2018–2019, 2025	Escape the Night	The Jetsetter/The Socialite	Main role; web series (Seasons 3–4, The Lost Tapes 19 episodes)
2019	Nailed It!	Herself	Episode: "Prehistoric Bakes"
2020	Onyx Monster Mysteries	Nessie	Voice role; Episode: "Nessie's Escape"
2020–2021	Craftopia	Herself	4 episodes
2021	Baketopia	Herself	Reality series; host and producer
2022	Halloween Cookie Challenge	Herself	12 episodes
2023	NCIS: Los Angeles	Tara Walker	Episode: "Shame"

=== Music videos ===
- "Dessert" (2015) by Dawin ft. Silentó

=== Video games ===
- Cookie Run: Kingdom (2021)

== Discography ==
=== Singles ===
List of singles
Title	Year	Album	Ref.
"Perfect Together"	2015	Non-album singles	
"Rainbow Magic" (featuring Schmoyoho)	2018	Non-album singles	
"Bad Moon Rising"	2023	Non-album singles	

== Bibliography ==
- The Nerdy Nummies Cookbook (2015)
- Baking All Year Round (2018)

== Awards and nominations ==
Awards and nominations received by Rosanna Pansino
Award	Year	Category	Nominated work	Result	Ref.
Shorty Awards	2013	Best in Food	Herself	Won	
Shorty Awards	2018	Best in Food	Herself	Won	
Streamy Awards	2014	Best Show of the Year	Nerdy Nummies	Nominated	
Streamy Awards	2014	Best Food and Cuisine	Nerdy Nummies	Nominated	
Streamy Awards	2015	Best Food and Cuisine	Nerdy Nummies	Nominated	
Streamy Awards	2017	Best Food and Cuisine	Nerdy Nummies	Nominated	
Streamy Awards	2018	Best Ensemble Cast	Escape the Night	Nominated	
Streamy Awards	2019	Best Food and Cuisine	Nerdy Nummies	Nominated	
Streamy Awards	2019	Best Ensemble Cast	Escape the Night	Nominated	
The Taste Awards	2016	Kikkoman Breakout Foodie of the Year	Herself	Won	
