= A Heist with Markiplier =

2019 American interactive film

- Release poster
- Directed by: Mark Fischbach
- Written by: Mark Fischbach
- Produced by: Jeff Guerrero
- Starring: Mark Fischbach; Rosanna Pansino; Matthew Patrick; Chance Morris
- Cinematography: Philip Roy
- Edited by: Kody Gibson; Dan Hirons
- Production companies: Markiplier, Inc.; Rooster Teeth Studios
- Distributed by: YouTube Premium
- Release date: October 30, 2019
- Running time: 90 minutes
- Country: United States
- Language: English

A Heist with Markiplier is a 2019 interactive comedy film written and directed by Mark Fischbach, better known by his online pseudonym Markiplier. The film stars Fischbach, as well as Rosanna Pansino, Matthew Patrick, and Chance Morris in major roles. It follows Fischbach on a heist with his assistant (the audience's POV) that goes wrong. If a part of the special is continuous, two end cards will direct viewers to different endings, of which there are 31.

Following the success of Fischbach's previous interactive video A Date with Markiplier in 2017, he wrote the script for the special a year later, although production did not start until 2019. The special was released on YouTube Premium for free on October 30, 2019, and received positive reviews from critics and audiences, who particularly praised Fischbach's performance and the engagement for the audience.

== Plot ==
Markiplier and his assistant (Note: To reflect the first-person perspective and allow for the viewer to self-insert, the assistant is always referred to with they/them pronouns) break into a museum to steal an ancient box located in a vault. A chain of escapades leads them to obtaining the two keys required to enter the vault. Mark grabs the box, triggering an alarm. Mark gives two escape options: going down a sewer, or using a bomb and escaping from the vault.

If they choose the sewer, they stumble upon a branch leading to a dark tunnel and a light one. Traveling to the light tunnel brings them to the middle of the ocean, resulting either with the assistant being abducted by pirates, or the pair being stranded on a deserted island, either being abducted by aliens, or joining a potential cannibal. If the assistant chooses the dark tunnel, Mark repeatedly suggests splitting up. This results in Mark's death or disappearance. Only one of the "split up" decisions results in the assistant being confronted by "Darkiplier", who tells them that he has hidden codes in every ending, as well as saying that Mark is a liar snake, leading to the final, 31st ending. (Note: Each ending is numbered out of 31, with an alphanumeric character briefly flashing. If the characters are placed in the numbered order, a password is created that unlocks the film's companion website, revealing behind-the-scenes footage and bloopers) If the assistant chooses not to split, the two enter a tunnel inhabited by the "Sewer Cult"; when chaos ensues, the assistant holds Mark over a pit. If they decide to let him go, the assistant escapes the tunnel. If they hang on, they both fall, along with the box from the vault. Mark finds a wormhole device, allowing them to escape and return to the start.

If the assistant chooses to use the bomb instead of the sewer to escape the vault, they and Mark escape and are presented with two getaway options: a helicopter or a car.

If the assistant chooses the helicopter, they are sent to a rehabilitation prison. The assistant can attempt to gain respect from the guards or the prisoners. If they attempt the former, they find themselves unsuccessful and try to do it on their own. In one of the resulting endings, the box contains a fairy that grants wishes, but is confiscated by a prison guard due to its noise. In another ending, Mark is ambushed by Bob, an undercover federal marshal. If the assistant shoots Bob, he takes off a mask to reveal that he is actually Wade. Mark is then shot by the real Bob, who then reveals that the assistant was also Wade all along. The assistant may also open the box, sending them back to the beginning. Refusing to enter a human-shaped hole reverses the roles of Bob and Wade, and travelling back in time results in the assistant being interviewed. Entering the hole, meanwhile, slowly deforms the assistant. If they attempt to gain the respect of the prisoners, inmate Yancy explains that none of the prisoners desire to leave, and asks if they still wish to leave. If they do not want to, they kill another inmate to achieve a life sentence. If they do wish to, Yancy offers assistance, helping the assistant leave prison if they agree, or killing them otherwise.

If the assistant chooses the car instead of the helicopter, Mark tells the assistant that the car broke down amid a ride. He offers options of walking or fix the car. If they decide to fix the car, a sinkhole separates them. The assistant reaches a cave, where a man named Illinois, resembling Indiana Jones, hands the assistant a cursed monkey statue and asks them to place it on a pedestal. If they refuse to place it, the assistant, seemingly possessed by the statue, attacks Illinois. If they place it, they are both briefly transported to the monkey heaven before Illinois leaves them behind.

If they decide to walk instead of fixing the car, a horde of zombies chase them. Unbeknownst to Mark, the assistant is bitten by one of the zombies. If they tell the truth, Mark tells them to go away, and the assistant lives with the zombies forever. Otherwise, they are given a choice between finding a scientist or going to a nearby shelter: Fort Brannagan, supposedly the only zombie-proof area. There, Mark and the assistant are inspected for bites by a soldier named Ed. If the assistant tells the truth about their bite, they are shot. If they do not, it is revealed that the fort has been infiltrated by zombies, and that Ed has been bitten, rigging the fort to explode to prevent the virus' spread. Then, the assistant reveals their bite to Mark.

The box from the vault is then revealed to be the "world's oldest picnic basket", and the assistant is given a choice between two ancient foods: a 2000-year-old peanut butter and jelly sandwich or a 17 AD tuna fish sandwich. The former turns the assistant into a relaxed zombie, creating a human-zombie utopia. The latter creates a cure to the zombie virus. At the lab, a scientist explains that an anomaly has caused time and space to warp; she believes the assistant is the anomaly, attempting to kill them. If they attempt to flee, the assistant becomes a zombie, attacking Mark. If they accept their fate, Mark takes the bullet for them, after which it is revealed that the box was the anomaly. As she destroys the box, the branching timeline of the film is briefly shown before returning to the 6th ending, with Mark and the assistant at the beginning, confused on why they are at the museum.

== Cast ==
- Mark Fischbach playing seven roles as
  - Markiplier
  - Darkiplier
  - Wilford Warfstache
  - Illinois
  - Inmate Yancy
  - Captain Magnum
  - Ending Narrator
- Rosanna Pansino as the Scientist (Prof. Beauregard)
- Matthew Patrick as the Hermit
- Chance Morris as Soldier Ed
- Gavin Free as Security Guard 1
- Dan Gruchy as Security Guard 2
- Arin Hanson as Alien 1
- Dan Avidan as Alien 2
- Ethan Nestor as Heapass / Zombethan
- Tyler Scheid as Zombyler
- Bob Muyskens as Security Guard 3 / Bob / Bubba
- Wade Barnes as Security Guard 4 / Wade / Wubba
- Mick Lauer as Warden Murder-Slaughter
- Michael Gregory as Bam Bam
- Andrew Gregory as Sparkles McGhee
- Kathryn Knutsen as The Producer
- Jason C. Campbell as Jimmy the Pickle / Pirate Goon
- Bri Marie Korin as Mark Stunt Double
- Holt Boggs as Prison Guard
- Lori Z. Cordova as Prison Processing Guard
- Robert Rexx as Prison Staff
- Mo Alfy as Burning Truck Driver
- Iba Thiam as Guide

== Production ==
In 2017, Fischbach created an interactive YouTube video, uploaded on Valentine's Day where the viewer could go on a date with him and make choices which affect said date, and can result in one of ten endings. The short gained over 90 million views on the platform, and inspired Fischbach to create A Heist with Markiplier. The line, "You wanna go on that date?," which was spoken in one of the endings of the short, suggests that the events of A Heist with Markiplier take place before A Date with Markiplier.

In late 2018, Fischbach wrote the script for A Heist with Markiplier, which in contrast to the original, had a total of 31 endings. He partnered up with Rooster Teeth to film it, and production was funded by YouTube Premium, who also distributed the special, due to wanting their own interactive-video-project.

Production started in Austin, Texas. Fischbach reprised his role as Mark, and internet personalities Rosanna Pansino, Matthew Patrick and Chance Morris joined the cast in main roles. Filming began in May 2019 and finished in June 2019.

== Reception ==
=== Critical response ===
In a review for the Clark Chronicle, Griselda Eychaner said, "That's what sets this series apart from everything else on YouTube: it's made for the viewer. The story is what you decide it should be. And it will go in a completely nonsensical direction no matter what you choose, so you can pretty much do what you want without fear of consequences."

=== Controversy ===
On November 6, 2019, a week after the special was released, Fischbach screened an interactive livestream on YouTube of the movie. Paid subscribers to his channel could navigate the choices of the movie with special emotes of a red paddle and a green paddle. The stream was supposed to be an interactive experience, but YouTube ended up banning hundreds of accounts watching the stream that "spammed" the emotes. It wasn't until nearly an hour and a half into the stream that the moderators noticed the problem.

Many YouTube users, and Fischbach himself, were upset about the situation. Fischbach explained that accounts weren't just getting banned; subscriptions were disappearing, content was being deleted, and it wasn't just YouTube accounts being deleted. Entire Google accounts were being terminated, and many users who filed appeals to get their accounts back had them denied. Eventually the accounts were reinstated.

Eventually, on November 11, 2019, Fischbach released a statement saying that he spoke with YouTube about the issue, and it was being worked on.

=== Awards and nominations ===
| Award | Category | Recipients | Result | Ref. |
|---|---|---|---|---|
| Streamy Awards | Show of the Year – Audience Choice | Mark Fischbach | Nominated | |
| Streamy Awards | Best Scripted Series | Mark Fischbach | Won | |

== In Space with Markiplier ==
In Space with Markiplier
- Directed by: Mark Fischbach; Philip Roy
- Written by: Mark Fischbach
- Produced by: Amy Nelson
- Starring: Mark Fischbach; Bob Muyskens; Pamela Horton; Arin Hanson
- Cinematography: Jordan Bradley
- Edited by: Kody Gibson; Ryan Gould
- Production companies: Markiplier Studios; YouTube Originals
- Distributed by: YouTube Premium
- Release date: April 4, 2022
- Running time: 255 minutes
- Country: United States
- Language: English

In Space with Markiplier is a 2022 two-part interactive science fiction comedy film written and directed by Mark Fischbach, better known by his online pseudonym Markiplier. It is the sequel to his 2019 interactive film A Heist with Markiplier, and stars Fischbach, Bob Muyskens, Pamela Horton, and Arin Hanson in major roles. It follows a captain of a spaceship (the audience's POV), named the "Invincible II", who is responsible for making tactical decisions when things on the spaceship suddenly go wrong when a multiversal crisis occurs.

Following the success of A Heist with Markiplier, Fischbach confirmed in 2020 that a sequel was in the works, and in 2021, after months of updates during development of the project, filming and production of the sequel took place in Austin, Texas. The two-part interactive film was released by YouTube Premium, with the first part released on April 4, 2022, and the second part released on May 2, 2022.

=== Plot ===
==== Part 1 ====
The Captain arrives at the Invincible II, and the ship's designer, Mark, gives the captain a tour of the vessel and introduces members of the crew. But suddenly, the Captain and the rest of the crew enter the cryo chambers when the warp core abruptly engages. While the ship is in a catastrophic state, the captain is sent through a wormhole, awakens, and is ejected from the chamber, which prompts them to attempt to resolve the situation. It is possible that the Captain makes a poor decision and dies as a result, sending them back to their cryo chamber when they woke up via a wormhole. There are five possible outcomes before the Captain "goes towards the light", though they are sent back again.

As the Captain prepares to enter the wormhole, Mark stumbles across him and the two fall into the wormhole before the Captain reaches the Warp Core. They wind up back on the ship, and Mark learns about the multiverse. The story continues on multiple branching paths, and the Captain interacts with characters such as the alien Wug, the Lady who seeks to kill them and questions them about what is happening, and the Bandit who provides the Captain with a Warp Device. The two-part story may end in one of two ways: either the Captain encounters the aged Mark, who inadvertently begins a universal collapse by trying to resolve the paradox from his previous attempt to resolve the paradox, or the Captain freezes in a cryo chamber, only to be found later by explorer Illinois who thinks the Captain is a mummy and re-locks them in. If the Captain receives the common ending of the universal collapse, then a loading bar is displayed to show the universe is rebooting.

==== Part 2 ====
The loading bar for the universal reboot finishes and the opening of Part 1 begins again, but multiple glitches occur, and the captain is transported to a universe in which they are the child of Stan the Water Man, where the prior events are implied to be a dream of the child. Stan attempts to read a bedtime story (which can be horror or romance depending on player choice), but the story is corrupted and the Captain is sent to a diner where they meet Old Mark, who apologizes for messing things up and recognizes that the fix is for Old Mark not to try to fix it. Old Mark instructs the Captain to ensure Mark never uses the Warp Core, and the Captain travels through various types of universes in search of a solution.

After passing through numerous universes, the multiverse is on the verge of collapse, and the Captain returns to the now-empty and barren diner. The Captain goes into another room to watch a timelapse of Mark constructing the Warp Core after Old Mark thanks him for trying and vanishes, just before Mark himself knocks them out. When Mark tries to correct the Captain's "mistakes" using his Warp Device, the Captain distracts him and a wormhole materializes. Mark tries to convince the Captain to let go as he is about to get sucked into it by claiming he can handle everything. If the Captain releases Mark, the Warp Core vanishes and the Captain is returned to the start of the narrative, though, if the Captain perseveres and tosses the Warp Crystal into the wormhole, the paradox is resolved and the multiverse is saved. As things return to normal, Mark acknowledges that he was the one who initially constructed the Warp Core and apologizes to the Captain. The captain wakes up in the original Invincible, now operational, and when the ship reaches its destination, Mark thanks the captain for not giving up.

In a post-credits scene following the decision where the Captain keeps Mark, the Warp Crystal is shown laying on the ground, and Darkiplier picks it up and says a line he said earlier in A Heist with Markiplier, connecting the stories of In Space with Markiplier and A Heist with Markiplier, and the Warp Crystal could potentially be the same shard embedded into the box the player tries to steal in A Heist with Markiplier, which would explain how the contents of the box affect which path you take, as it is an object that can manipulate the fabric of the multiverse itself.

=== Cast ===
- Mark Fischbach playing seven roles as
  - Markiplier
  - Darkiplier
  - Wilford Warfstache
  - Illinois
  - Inmate Yancy
  - Stan the Water Man
  - Jim
- Jordan Bradley as the Captain
- Pamela Horton as Celcionna F. Kelvina
- Mick Lauer as Gunther B. Gunnerson
- Bob Muyskens as Burt
- Lio Tipton as Lady / Universal Stability Agency (USA) agent
- Arin Hanson as the Narrator
- Dan Avidan as Sexy Crew / Danny Sexbang
- Ethan Nestor as the Wormhole
- Tyler Scheid as the First Mate
- Wade Barnes as Wug
- Morgan Simone as the Bandit
- Linda Bradshaw as Dorene L. Whitacre
- Steve Taylor as the Computer
- Holt Boggs as the Shuttle Pilot
- Matthew Patrick as Theory Crew / Mack
- Brian Wecht as Ninja Crew / Ninja Brian
- Danielle Ploeger as Alien Teen
- Seán McLoughlin as the Drones
- Robert Rexx as the Chef
- Imane Anys as the Cyro Computer
- Baldemort as the Invincible Tower

=== Production ===
After the success of A Heist with Markiplier, Fischbach teased the idea of a sequel in a December 2019 interview. He said, "If I do it again, and I might, I would wanna do it in an even better way than I did this time. And I have no idea what that means, and I have no idea how to say that, but, you know, if I did it again I would wanna surpass what I've already made."

In November 2020, after the channel Unus Annus was deleted, he confirmed in the video "Unus Annus - Post Mortem" that a sequel was in development.

After months of updates on writing the project, Fischbach announced that he had travelled back to Austin, Texas to film the sequel. On September 3, 2021, Fischbach announced that its title would be In Space with Markiplier. A trailer was released on March 4, 2022.

In Space with Markiplier consists of two parts. Part 1 was released on April 4, 2022, on the same day as the 10th anniversary of the Markiplier channel, and Part 2 was released on May 2, 2022.

=== Reception ===
In Space with Markiplier received generally positive reviews. In a review for Compass News, Benedicto Campo describes In Space with Markiplier as "fun, engaging, enjoyable, and exciting to watch and take part in." Campo also states, "Although it can be very confusing upon the first watch, it will be lots more fun once you get used to it and view it again multiple times."

==== Awards and nominations ====
| Award | Category | Recipients | Result | Ref. |
|---|---|---|---|---|
| Streamy Awards | Show of the Year | Mark Fischbach | Nominated | |
| Streamy Awards | Scripted Series | Mark Fischbach | Won | |
| Children's and Family Emmy Awards | Outstanding Interactive Media | Mark Fischbach | Nominated | |
