= Baketopia =

American reality TV series

- Genre: Reality television
- Presented by: Rosanna Pansino
- Judges: Rosanna Pansino; Donal Skehan; Timbo Sullivan
- Country of origin: United States
- Original language: English
- No. of seasons: 1
- No. of episodes: 12

Production
- Production company: B17 Entertainment

Original release
- Network: HBO Max
- Release: March 25, 2021

Baketopia is an American reality television series hosted by Rosanna Pansino. The series premiered on HBO Max on March 25, 2021, and consisted of 12 episodes. The series was canceled due to the merger of HBO Max and Discovery+.

== Premise ==
Rosanna Pansino creates challenges that bakers must complete.

Each episode focuses around two baking challenges, called "tiers", in which the contestants compete to create desserts according to the challenge's rules. The winner of the first tier receives $1,000 and a gold brooch portraying a rolling pin.

The second tier always focuses on cakes. The winner receives $10,000 and a trophy.

== Cast ==
Rosanna Pansino hosted and judged. Donal Skehan and Timbo Sullivan also appeared.

== Episodes ==
The winners of the first-tier competition are listed in italic. The winners of the second-tier competition are listed in bold. The winners of both tiers are listed in both.

No.	Title	Contestants	Original release date
1	"Jelly Island"	Pavani, **Gregory**, Lena	March 25, 2021
The bakers create cocktail-inspired cupcakes and island jelly cakes.
2	"Frozen in Time"	**Heather**, Andrew, Darlene	March 25, 2021
The bakers create ice cream sandwiches and gravity cakes.
3	"A Batch Made in Heaven"	Gelia, **Harvey**, Dani	March 25, 2021
The bakers create hollow chocolate domes that melt to reveal the dessert inside, then two-sided wedding cakes.
4	"Fry Your Heart Out"	Piper, Anya, **Jamie**	March 25, 2021
The bakers create fried carnival desserts and cakes that incorporate a mechanism.
5	"Cereal-ously Delicious!"	Rockii, **Randy**, Amanda	March 25, 2021
The bakers create cream-filled desserts from cereal milk and illusion crepe cakes.
6	"Beasts of Baketopia"	Megan, Jon, **Jamie**	March 25, 2021
The bakers create 2D cookie puzzles that can be solved to reveal 3D cakes.
7	"Easy as Pie-rates"	**Michelle**, Michael, Jason	March 25, 2021
The bakers create pirate-themed pies and treasure hunt surprise cakes.
8	"Herb Your Enthusiasm"	Shruti, **Frank**, Kathleen	March 25, 2021
The bakers create vegan macarons and plant-themed cakes.
9	"Baby, You Can Drive My Cake"	**Camisha**, Kim, Jamie	March 25, 2021
The bakers create remote-controlled cakes.
10	"Bakers of the Galaxy"	**Carolina**, Justin, Rhamani	March 25, 2021
The bakers create galaxy-themed donuts and geode-themed cakes. Special Guest Judge: Chef Benny Rivera replacing Donal Skehan Absent: Donal Skehan as Main Judge
11	"Fake It 'Til You Cake It"	Sandra, **Jeasy**, Michael	March 25, 2021
The bakers create hyper-realistic cakes.
12	"Bake of Art"	Sachiko, **Brian**, Korey	March 25, 2021
The bakers create edible versions of themselves and reproduce famous paintings as cakes.

== Cancellation ==
Bloomberg in 2022 reported that the show and its sister show Craftopia were canceled and removed from HBO Max due to the expected 2023 merger of HBO Max and Discovery+.

== International broadcast ==
In Canada, the series premiered on Family Channel on June 14, 2021.
