= Nekro G =

American rapper

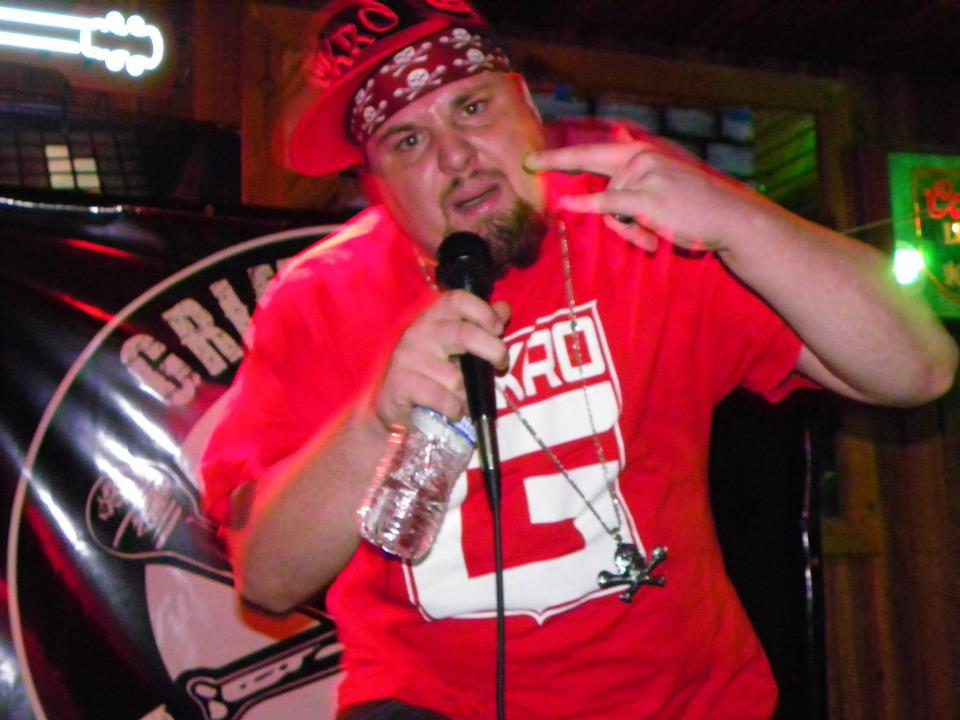

Background information
- Also known as: Nekro G
- Born: Gerald Lee Smith; September 20, 1983 (age 42)
- Origin: Riverside, California, United States
- Genres: Hip hop, West Coast
- Occupation: Rapper
- Years active: 1998–present
- Label: Grim Reality Entertainment
- Website: grimrealityentertainment.net

Gerald Lee Smith (born September 20, 1983), better known by his stage-name Nekro G, is an American rapper, songwriter, promoter and record label owner from Riverside, California. He is currently signed to Grim Reality Entertainment and is the owner of Wikid Funk Records, founded in June 2003.

== Biography ==
Nekro G began writing and recording Hip-Hop music in 1998. At this time he started recording his first mixtape and performing at local Southern California shows with Darryl Bowman who rapped under "Dimesac D", together they formed a rap group called "Sinister-X". In early 2002 they started D&S Records and released a mixtape that was given away for free entitled "Buried Memories". In June 2002 they met a kid Denis Sudar from Pomona who rapped under "Zero", they all clicked and shortly after Zero had joined Sinister-X and the trio began working on an album together entitled "Brain Dead Killaz LP". In February 2003, the group released "Buried Memories 2" of cuts that were not going on the main cd, it was also given away for free at shows. In June 2003 Sinister-X released "Brain Dead Killaz LP" and even went as far as to press a small quantity of physical cds professionally, however the day the album dropped all 3 members had inner conflict with each other and the group was disbanded and has never been reformed since. However, in 2018 on Halloween Nekro G, Dimesac D and Ras Al Ghoul put out Track, Which was Followed up by another Track Featuring Nekro G, Dimesac D, Ras Al Ghoul, and DocWicked.

In July 2003, Nekro G formed his own music label, Wikid Funk Records and began recording a frenzy of new music. Since that time, he has released over 40 mixtapes, including 8 official solo album mixtapes, 10 Rant's & Ravings mixtapes, various group projects, and countless features and collaborations with other artists. Wikid Funk Records has had a revolving door of underground artists. Nekro G has played numerous underground shows in Southern California, including being featured on an opening set at the Key club in Los Angeles for The Twiztid and KMK's "Chaos and Chronic Tour" in 2012. He also played for both Westcoast Wickidfest shows (thrown by Grim Reality Entertainment and Netherworld Records and featuring Hopsin, Scum, Insane Poetry, Smallz One and JP Tha Hustler). In 2010, Nekro G was named RapChamp.com winner of their 2010 Rap Competition.

In 2010, Nekro G won The Rap Champ, Championship at rapchamp.com (site no longer exist).

In early 2011, JP Tha Hustler collaborated with Nekro G for the song "Dogg." JP was happy with the song and signed Nekro G to Grim Reality Entertainment; the song later appeared on Nekro G's debut EP. On June 19, 2011, Nekro G released his first professional CD on Grim Reality Entertainment, entitled "Real, Raw, Rap EP".

In late December 2011 Nekro G released his first single for his next record, as well as his first real music video on YouTube, entitled "Take The Trash Out" Nekro G also appeared multiple times on the Grim Reality compilation entitled "New Breed" that was released on December 5, 2011.

Nekro G released a full-length LP for Grim Reality Entertainment, entitled "Reel Street Musik" on October 13, 2012, at his CD Release Show in Riverside. It Featured collaborations with SlyzWicked, Sonny Jonez, JP Tha Hustler, and Insane Poetry.

In October 2012 Nekro G was named "Best Hip Hop Artist in IE of 2012" in I.E. Weekly.

On October 31, 2012, Nekro G and Fellow Underground Artist Spek One, Dr. Edrum & SlyzWicked collectively released a new double LP mixtape entitled "Moodswing'n Vol.1" for free download on datpiff.com

In early 2013, Nekro G was featured in an article in Horrorcore Magazine.

On July 18, 2013 "Grim Reality Entertainment's Skull & Cross Mics" Compilation dropped in stores nationwide, under a distribution deal with Long Range and EOne/Koch. In October 2013 he was featured numerous times on the GRE compilation "Dark Scriptures". In November 2013, he then released his 3rd GRE Release "Beyond Beast LP" and had been playing numerous shows with bigger named artist such as Twiztid and Ces Cru.

April 20, 2014 marked the release of his new group "Godpawn" with partner Mulligan and their album "I.M.M.O.D" (an acronym for 'I Make My Own Destiny') which was put out by Anti-Authority Records and Freedom Union Records. The album features appearances by Strange Music's Ces Cru, Esham, Twisted Insane, Madchild, Delusional, and Kung Fu Vampire.

Nekro G released a single "I Will Kxll Ya'll" in August 2014, and his new record "Thought Crimes" on October 4, 2014, both featuring Playboy The Beast.

On January 1, 2015, Nekro G was Featured multiple times on Grim Reality Entertainments "Westcoast Heatwave" CD, later in 2015 he was Big Legion's album "Crown Town Villain" on the track "Numb". In 2016, he was featured on the Grim Reality Entertainment "Remixes" Compilation and was on Slyzwicked's "Silent Assassin" on 3 separate tracks.

In 2017, Nekro G Put out the Digital Single "There She Go" & a Remix & Collaborations CD, featuring some new content.

In 2018, Nekro G Put out 2 new Digital Singles "Too Raw Feat. Grewsum & Nitro, Both off a rumored upcoming album.

It was in mid 2018 that Nekro G began Branching off and working as a studio artist and Ghostwriter, Since then he has been featured on numerous other CD's & singles by various other artist.

In January 2019, Miniminter, Of the YouTube group Sidemen, Posted a video of Nekro G dissing the Sidemen in a Rap, the video has to date garnered over 4 Million Views. The song was also posted separately on Miniminters 2nd Channel "MM7Gaming" is now sitting at over 1 Million views.

In 2020, Nekro G Dissed YouTubers "AmandaTheJedi" and "Mister GG" on their respective channels.

In 2023, Nekro G remade a Collaboration with "The Chalkeaters" which garnered over 4 million views on YouTube in just 2 weeks.

In October 2023, Nekro G was part of the Group "The Lost Boys" and their debut record "The Prophecy" Was nominated for Best Horrorcore Album by the GRRRD Awards.

Nekro G is currently working on a new album

== Personal life ==
Nekro G graduated from Glendora High School and attended Citrus College for music production. He currently resides in Riverside, Ca. He is married and also has two daughters. He is a strong supporter of the hip hop movement.

== Discography ==
=== Studio albums ===
- 2011: Nekro G – Real, Raw, Rap EP
- 2012: Nekro G – Reel Street Musik LP
- 2013: Nekro G - Beyond Beast LP
- 2014: Nekro G - Thought Crimes
- 2017: Nekro G - Remixes & Collaborations
- 2023: Lost Boys - The Prophecy

=== Digital Singles ===
- 2011: Take The Trash Out
- 2011: Army of Darkness Remix
- 2011: West Kills It Feat. Mad Choppa
- 2014: I Will Kxll Ya'll Remix Feat. JP Tha Hustler & Playboy The Beast
- 2015: I'ma Eat Remix Feat. JP Tha Hustler & Donnie Menace
- 2016: Now You Know Feat. Speak One & JP Tha Hustler
- 2017: Murder Spree Feat. Speak One & JP Tha Hustler
- 2017: Bloodspray Remix Feat. Smallz One & JP Tha Hustler
- 2017: There She Go
- 2018: Nitro
- 2018: Too Raw Feat. Grewsum
- 2019: Stop Sfera
- 2019: Seeing Things
- 2019: SIDEMEN DISS TRACK (Youtube Exclusive)
- 2019: Hell Yeah
- 2019: Black & White
- 2019 Issues (Remix)
- 2019: Beyond Beast (Lupah Phaiym Remix)
- 2019: Da Fantom (Lupah Phaiym Remix)
- 2021: Ya Heard Of Us! Feat. Killa Gabe, JP Tha Hustler, Slyzwicked, & Liquid Assassin

=== Studio Albums Featured on ===
- 2011: Tha Ghost – Amerika's Most Hated (Directors Cut)
- 2011: Grim Reality Entertainment – New Breed Compilation
- 2012: Taab Frio – Put it on My Taab EP
- 2012: VD – Hardcore Hip Hop LP
- 2012: JP Tha Hustler – 100% Hardcore LP
- 2013: Spitz - Mcmxviii LP
- 2013: Slyz Wicked - Only The Strong Survive LP
- 2013: Dr Edrum - Who They Come to Party With? EP
- 2013: Killa Gabe - From Tha Guttas of Mighty Sac LP
- 2013: Grim Reality Entertainment – Skull & Cross Mics Compilation
- 2013: Spek One & Two Cees - Go Getter Gang LP
- 2013: JP Tha Hustler - No Pressure LP
- 2013: B Muné - Instant Fans Just Add Music LP
- 2013: Grim Reality Entertainment - Dark Scriptures Compilation
- 2013: Uncle Phoenix - The Rebirth
- 2014: Cali G - G Classic LP
- 2014: Dr. Edrum - Foot in The Door LP
- 2014: SlyzWicked - It Lives Within LP
- 2014: Godpawn - I.M.M.O.D. LP
- 2014: Spek One - Nothing To Prove LP
- 2014: TwoCees - Magnifique Manifesto LP
- 2014: JP Tha Hustler - Dissinfekted LP
- 2014: Insane Poetry - Killaborations
- 2015: Grim Reality Entertainment - Westcoast Heatwave Compilation
- 2015: JP Tha Hustler - Mad Scientist LP
- 2015: Big Legion - Crown Town Villain LP
- 2016: SlyzWicked - Silent Assassin
- 2016: Grim Reality Entertainment - The Remixes
- 2017: JP Tha Hustler & SlyzWicked - BeastMode LP
- 2017: JP Tha Hustler - Remixes & Collaborations
- 2017: J-Pegs the Legend - PEGNO
- 2018: Mad Choppa - Chopera
- 2018: Insane Poetry & JP Tha Hustler - Team Guillotine
- 2018: Benny Charles - Rhythm, Blues, & Gospel: A Story of Love, Hope, & Faith
- 2018: Right Sight Productions / Various Artist - Letting Go
- 2018: Grim Reality Entertainment - We Are Hip Hop
- 2018: JP Tha Hustler - Halloween Horror Mix
- 2018: JP Tha Hustler - Powerlifting Hardcore Workout Mix 2
- 2018: JP Tha Hustler - MMA Workout Mix
- 2018: JP Tha Hustler - Hard Rock & Hip Hop
- 2018: JP Tha Hustler - Powerlifting Hardcore Workout Mix
- 2018: EmeryTheArtist - Dreamstate
- 2018: Various Artist - Letting Go!
- 2018: DJ Mystic - Oblivion
- 2019: What is That - What Is That
- 2019: Benny Charles - Rhythm, Blues, & Gospel: A Story of Love, Hope, 7 Faith
- 2019: Penta - Inside My Head
- 2019: Collective - What is that
- 2019: Freddex - A Haunted House
- 2019: Centurion - Kiss My Diss
- 2019: YomiShious - Split Personality
- 2019: Twarlex - Beware of the Leopard
- 2019: D00f - Fear
- 2019: Choatic Hostility - First Rule No Rules
- 2019: Halloween Hope - Party Music
- 2019: Grim Reality Entertainment - Trap Music
- 2019: Lupah Phaiym Remixes Vol. 2
- 2019: Encoded Files: StreetScape, Vol.1
- 2019: Beastmode Warriors - Art of War
- 2020: Beastmode Warriors - Apex Predators
- 2020: Beastmode Warriors - Warhammer (Remixes)
- 2020: Grim Singmuf - Deviant Dialect
- 2020: Grim Singmuf - Immaculate Cacophony
- 2020: Grim Singmuf - Existence
- 2021: Armada The Producer - Last of The Assassins
- 2021: XoBrooklynne - My Crown The Album
- 2021: JP Tha Hustler - The Amazing Hustler-Man, Vol.1
- 2021: Beastmode Warriors - Way of The Warrior
- 2022: Luna Carina - Lily
- 2022: Beastmode Warriors - Beastmode Wicked

=== Digital Singles Featured on ===
- 2016: Fat D - Not Too Long Ago Single Feat. Nekro G
- 2016: Madd Locc - Run it Feat. Nekro G, A.N.T. & Don Orias
- 2017: Jay Spark - Boiling Point Feat. Nekro G & Slyzwicked (Remastered)
- 2018: YomiShious - Radiate Feat. Nekro G
- 2018: Klem - Aesthetic Feat. Nekro G
- 2019: Legna Zeg - Black & White Feat. Nekro G
- 2019: Pax Vici - F*cking Fish Feat. Nekro G
- 2019: Prof. G - Push It Harder Feat. Nekro G
- 2019: The Chalkeaters - Bowsette Feat. M-G UniNew & Nekro G
- 2019: Stone Troll - The Conspiracist Feat. Nekro G
- 2019: Not Uncomplicated - This World is Mine Feat. Nekro G
- 2019: Nick Will - Till the Grave Feat. Nekro G
- 2019: Grim Singmuf - Music Medicinals Feat. Nekro G
- 2019: Grim Singmuf - Datura Tea Feat. Nekro G
- 2022: Alias Molombo - Zombie Party Crush Feat A-F-R-O & Nekro G
- 2022: Luna Carina - Eager to Gain Feat. Jasmin Tietze, King Marino & Nekro G
- 2022: Beastmode Warriors - Bullet 2 My Brain Feat. Scum & Nekro G
- 2022: Skull & Crossmics 2022 Cypher, Pt.1
- 2023: The Chalkeaters - Bowsette (Remake) Feat. Meret Giddy & Nekro G

=== Mixtapes ===
- 2002: Sinister-X – Buried Memories
- 2003: Sinister-X – Buried Memories 2
- 2003: Sinister-X – Brain Dead Killaz LP
- 2005: Nekro G – Dark Prophecies LP
- 2005: Nekro G – Rants and Ravings 1
- 2006: Nekro G – Psychotic Poetry LP
- 2007: Nekro G – Rants and Ravings 2
- 2007: IllLogical Madness (Nekro G & VD) – Open Mind Surgery LP
- 2007: Nekro G – Rants and Ravings 3
- 2008: Nekro G – Rants and Ravings 4
- 2008: Nekro G – Straight out The Pen LP
- 2008: Nekro G – Rants and Ravings 5
- 2008: Satans Sick Symphony LP(Nekro G, VD, Dr Ed, Tha Burden) – (Self Titled)
- 2009: SWK Rydaz(Nekro G, VD, Dr Ed, Tha Burden) – Jack Yo Shyt LP
- 2009: Nekro G – Rants and Ravings 6
- 2009: Nekro G – Final Chapter LP
- 2009: Nekro G – Rants and Ravings 7
- 2009: IllLogical Madness – Absurd Thoughtz LP
- 2009: Nekro G – Rants and Ravings 8
- 2009: The Gruntz LP – (Self Titled)
- 2010: Nekro G – Rants and Ravings 9
- 2010: Nekro G – Rants and Ravings 10
- 2010: SWK Rydaz – Talkin Shyt LP
- 2010: Satans Sick Symphony (Nekro G, VD, Dr Ed, Tha Burden) – Solo's & Sililoquys
- 2010: SWK Rydaz – Fuck Yo Shyt LP
- 2010: Nekro G – New Revelationz LP
- 2010: Nekro G – Rants and Ravings 11
- 2010: Nekro G – Street Soldier LP
- 2011: Nekro G – Torn Scriptures LP
- 2011: Nekro G – Rants and Ravings 12
- 2011: Riv Rydaz LP (Nekro G & Sonny Jonez) – (Self Titled)
- 2011: Nekro G – West Coast OG LP

=== Wikid Funk Mixtapes Featured on ===
- 2009: Tha Burden – Tha Mutha Fxckin LP
- 2009: VD – Infected LP
- 2009: Dr Ed – The Dr I Sin LP
- 2009: Arkham Rejects – Out the Asylum LP
- 2009: VD Presents – Tha Gruesome & Grotesque LP
- 2010: Somoan Sweet Thang – Pimp Canes & Cocaine LP
- 2010: Sons of Sam – Sons of Killaz LP
- 2010: Wikid Funk Skunk LP: The Smokers CD
- 2010: Bonified LP – (Self titled)

=== Other Mixtapes Featured on ===
RapChamp Championship Series Mixtape Vol.2

- 2007: Xplicit – Parental Advisory
- 2007: Psypher – O.C. Soulja
- 2012: Moodswing'n Vol. 1 (Double Disc LP)
- 2013: Young Murdoc - Kali Kush Mixtape Vol 2
- 2013: Mista Creepz - Smoke & Mirrors
- 2015: J-Pegs the Legend - The Meaning Of Life
- 2016: J-Pegs the Legend - 10 Rings
- 2016: J-Pegs the Legend - Red Hot
- 2016: J-Pegs the Legend - Captain Pegs 3
- 2016: J-Pegs the Legend - The Meaning of Life 2
- 2017: Ghetto-T Trapped in the 419
- 2018: J-Pegs the Legend - Dirty Pepsi 6
- 2018: J-Pegs the Legend - Flannel God
- 2018: J-Pegs the Legend - Captain Pegs 11
- 2019: Earworm Entertainment- Mixtape Vol. 3

=== Accolades ===
- Part of GRE when Winning Best Hip Hop Label in IE 2013 - IE Weekly
- Best Hip Hop Artist in IE 2012 – IE Weekly
- 2010 Rap Champ – RapChamp.com
