= Amanda the Adventurer =

- Logo for the first game
- Genres: Horror, puzzle
- Developer: MANGLEDmaw Games
- Publisher: DreadXP
- Platforms: Windows; Nintendo Switch; Nintendo Switch 2; PlayStation 4; PlayStation 5; Xbox One; Xbox Series X/S
- First release: Amanda the Adventurer; April 25, 2023
- Latest release: Amanda the Adventurer 3 November 6, 2025

Amanda the Adventurer is a puzzle and horror video game series developed by MANGLEDmaw Games and published by DreadXP. Partially inspired by the children's television series Dora the Explorer, the series centers upon Riley Park, who attempts to uncover the sinister mystery surrounding the titular fictional children's show.

The series started as an entry into a game jam in April 2022, known as the Pilot Episode, and was developed into a full game in April 2023 after it was acquired by DreadXP. The game spawned a trilogy, with Amanda the Adventurer 2 being released in October 2024 and Amanda the Adventurer 3 in November 2025. A film adaptation, produced by Matthew Patrick, is in development at Blumhouse Productions and Epic Pictures Group.

== Gameplay ==
During all 6 games (including the demos), players must solve puzzles and locate VHS tapes containing episodes from the children's series Amanda the Adventurer. While screening the tapes, players can interact with Amanda and her sheep companion, Wooly, which can in turn impact the player's environment and game endings. The player assumes control of Riley Park, a non-gender-specific character who is tasked with investigating the mystery surrounding the show and the sinister company Hameln Entertainment. There are a few secret tapes to unlock such secret endings. Each decision that players make can affect how the game ends.

== Plot ==
=== Amanda the Adventurer (2023) ===
Riley Park receives a letter from their Aunt Kate, who has recently died and bequeathed to them her home in Kensdale, Ohio while mentioning a VHS tape in her attic. After arriving at Kate's house, Riley enters the attic and discovers that the tape contains an episode of Amanda the Adventurer, a children's television series that started out as a public-access live action show, before being acquired by a company called Hameln Entertainment which turned it into a computer-animated cartoon. During its run, parents became concerned about the show's increasingly dark content, with several children going missing, which led Kate to investigate it.

As Riley plays the tape, they are introduced to the show's titular protagonist, Amanda, and her timid but friendly sidekick Wooly, an anthropomorphic sheep. Both are able to fully interact with Riley, and by completing various puzzles, Riley discovers more Amanda the Adventurer tapes, including secret ones that hint at Hameln's darker intentions, along with behind-the-scenes footage about the series and its missing creator, Sam Colton, who had his adopted daughter, Rebecca, portray Amanda.

If Riley types any answer in the tape "Everything Rots!" or refuses to help a kitten in the tape "What's a Family?", a grey skeleton-like entity resembling Amanda breaks through the trapdoor and lunges at Riley, killing them. If Riley answers correctly in "Everything Rots!" and rescues the kitten instead, the television then turns off. After this, Riley walks to the trapdoor, which leads to a white void, where Riley finds themselves as one of the hanging meats in a butcher shop, watching the butcher cut meat in front of them. The screen fades to black before returning to the main menu.

When watching the final tape, "We Can Share", if Riley declines to hear Amanda's secret, Amanda says in disappointment, "I thought you were different." The ending involves the attic being cleared out with a piece of paper with the word "LEAVE" on it in the middle. With the trapdoor open, the screen fades to black on approach, and the credits roll. If Riley accepts Amanda's request instead, she tells Riley that she is "out there somewhere", before the television violently glitches, forcing Riley to throw a brick at the television, destroying it. Afterward, the sun rises through the windows, and the credits roll after fading to black. If the player finds all of the secret tapes (except for "Herd of Mouth"), Riley discovers that a masked figure has entered the attic.

=== Amanda the Adventurer 2 (2024) ===
Continuing on from where the first game ended, the masked figure tells Riley that she is a friend of Kate's, and later takes them to Kate's former workplace, the Kensdale Public Library, where Riley is again tasked with finding more Amanda the Adventurer tapes while the masked figure stays outside to keep watch, using a walkie-talkie to communicate with Riley.

As Riley solves various puzzles and watches all of the library's Amanda the Adventurer tapes, Amanda and Wooly frequently encounter an opossum who meddles in their adventures. During these interactions, Riley must also avoid the wrath of Amanda's entity, who will attack them if Amanda is not satisfied with Riley's choices. Riley can also discover other tapes which reveal that Sam Colton was abducted by Hameln, Kate was a member of a secret group investigating Hameln and the tapes for the past fifteen years, and that Hameln kept Rebecca in a vegetative state and used her to control Amanda as a supernatural avatar, who would entice children to come to Hameln's facility.

In the standard ending, the masked figure gathers all of the tapes in a box and breaks one with a bandage on it, releasing a blue aura from it. This then causes Amanda's entity to burst through the ceiling and pin her to the desk. Grabbing a blank VHS tape, Riley escapes through a secret hatch that was installed in Kate's office. In the true ending, if the player finds all four of the game's secret tapes, Riley watches an alternate version of the last Amanda tape, where the opossum hears the masked figure's voice over Riley's radio, and tries to cry out "Joanne" before Amanda and Wooly subdue him. Riley then obtains a secret audio cassette tape which recorded Kate's last words to them, stating that everyone investigating Hameln has died, and warning Riley to destroy the tapes before being killed in a car crash. Overhearing this, the masked figure reveals herself to be Joanne Cook, whose younger brother, Jordan, was one of the missing children. Joanne tells Riley that she was convinced that Jordan is trapped in the tapes and that destroying them will free him, and that she manipulated Kate into helping her and caused Amanda's entity to attack them, indirectly leading to Kate's death. She then urges Riley to flee, but she is suddenly killed by another sheep-like entity resembling Wooly, forcing Riley to escape down the hatch with the blank VHS tape.

=== Amanda the Adventurer 3 (2025) ===
Ten years before Riley found the tapes, an unnamed associate of Kate's infiltrates Hameln Entertainment in an attempt to find Rebecca. He is unsuccessful, but he finds eight pods containing the missing children, who are being used to portray the inanimate objects in Amanda the Adventurer. The associate then attempts to disable the alarm system via Amanda's scavenger hunt tape, but he is ultimately caught and killed by security.

In the present day, Riley manages to escape from Wooly's entity by fleeing into the sewers and entering the abandoned Hameln facility containing the pods. However, Wooly's entity follows them and persistently attempts to enter the facility. In order to progress, Riley must watch more tapes and solve puzzles. The opossum reappears in the tapes, angering Wooly but delighting Amanda, who names him "Chicken Scratch". Upon discovering other tapes and audio logs, Riley learns that Sam Colton was killed in his attempt to rescue Rebecca and unwittingly unleashed Amanda's entity, codenamed "The Colton Anomaly", a manifestation born from a discharge from the technology that Hameln used to harness Rebecca's psychic powers. Eventually, Riley is tasked with disarming the alarm system using the same scavenger hunt tape, during which Chicken Scratch grows increasingly distressed as he is aware that Wooly's entity is approaching. Riley manages to solve the puzzle just as Wooly's entity breaks into the pod room and destroys the pods, killing the occupants (with Chicken Scratch being one of them), while Riley escapes via a nearby elevator.

Riley is taken to the facility's inner sanctum, a small satanic chapel, and watches several more tapes. Wooly is soon revealed to be Marcus Moutman, a Hameln employee hired to monitor Amanda, and that his entity, codenamed "Shepherd", was created as a more subservient version of the Anomaly which Hameln then used to find and destroy the remaining tapes. Having been jealous and furious throughout Amanda's friendship with Chicken Scratch and Riley, Wooly has a mental breakdown, which causes him to glitch and disappear. Riley solves one final puzzle that allows them access to a chasm-surrounded area with a stasis chamber containing Rebecca, and finally release her.

There are two endings depending on the player's choices. In the standard ending, Riley and Rebecca witness the Anomaly and Shepherd fight over the final tape, which contains the part of Rebecca's soul that makes up Amanda. However, they both end up falling into the chasm to their deaths, along with the tape, which leads Rebecca to lament that she will "never be whole again". In the true ending, after the player collects all of the four secret tapes, the Anomaly appears severely wounded after killing Shepherd offscreen. Rebecca then takes the final tape and breaks it, causing the Anomaly to disintegrate and Amanda to disappear. As Riley and Rebecca leave the chamber, an outtake recorded during Sam and Rebecca's public-access show is played.

== Development ==
The first Amanda the Adventurer game was released in 2022 as part of DreadXP's Found Footage Jam on Itch.io. The game, which has been referred to as Amanda the Adventurer: Pilot Episode, was developed by Ontario-based developer MANGLEDmaw Games, along with Arcadim and SinisterCid. In October 2022, DreadXP made an announcement that they had acquired the title for Amanda the Adventurer and would work with MANGLEDmaw to create a full game. A demo of the full game was premiered at PAX East in early 2023. The studio chose to recast the role of Amanda for the full game in order to have a dark-skinned actress voice the character, as the prior voice actress was chosen due to convenience.

The first full Amanda the Adventurer game was released on April 25, 2023, via Steam and featured localized subtitles for multiple languages. The game was given a release on the Nintendo Switch in September of the same year and, in 2024, Amanda the Adventurer released to the PlayStation and Xbox consoles.

A sequel entitled Amanda the Adventurer 2 was announced in October 2023 and released to Steam on October 22, 2024. In 2025, the sequel released to the PlayStation, Xbox, and Nintendo Switch consoles. A third game entitled Amanda the Adventurer 3 was announced on April 25 and released on November 6, 2025, which serves as the finale of the series. A demo featuring a prologue was released on June 19. One year later, in May 2026, the game released to consoles on May 28.

== Reception ==
After its release the first Amanda the Adventurer game became popular with online gaming streamers, and per PCGamesN videos relating to the game received approximately 1.5 billion views on YouTube. Vice.com praised the game for its aesthetics and puzzles, as well as the choice to make the game start off "disarmingly sweet and wholesome".

GamesRadar+ reviewed the first game, warning readers that some of the game's visuals could be disturbing and that it did not end with any definitive answers, while also noting that, "otherwise, Amanda the Adventurer is a startlingly effective horror game deceptively wrapped in the aesthetics of an old analog horror game and retro children's TV shows". Prima Games was also critical of the game ending with too many unanswered questions; they also praised the game's writing, worldbuilding, and puzzles. TouchArcade reviewed the first game's Nintendo Switch port, stating that it was an overall good port but that "I feel like the change to how you interact with preset options rather than inputting on a keyboard like in the PC version holds this back from its true potential".

Hardcore Gamer reviewed the second game, stating that it was "a fun adventure title that delivers solid puzzles, great performances and a nice mixture of dread and humor, but a few sloppy decisions and a lack of anything substantial in either the gameplay or story areas hold it back".

In their review for the third entry, Hardcore Gamer found that the game and overall series had some visual flaws while overall praising the puzzles. Gayming gave the entry a score of 6/10, praising the gameplay and lore while criticizing that players were unable to backtrack to solve puzzles as they could in prior entries.

== Film adaptation ==
On October 9, 2026, it was officially announced at New York Comic Con 2026 that Blumhouse Productions was in the works of creating a film adaptation of the video game with internet personality Matthew Patrick producing. It was also confirmed that Patrick was in the works to create at least two other films in collaboration with the studio.
