= Mike Lamond =

American sports announcer (born 1987)

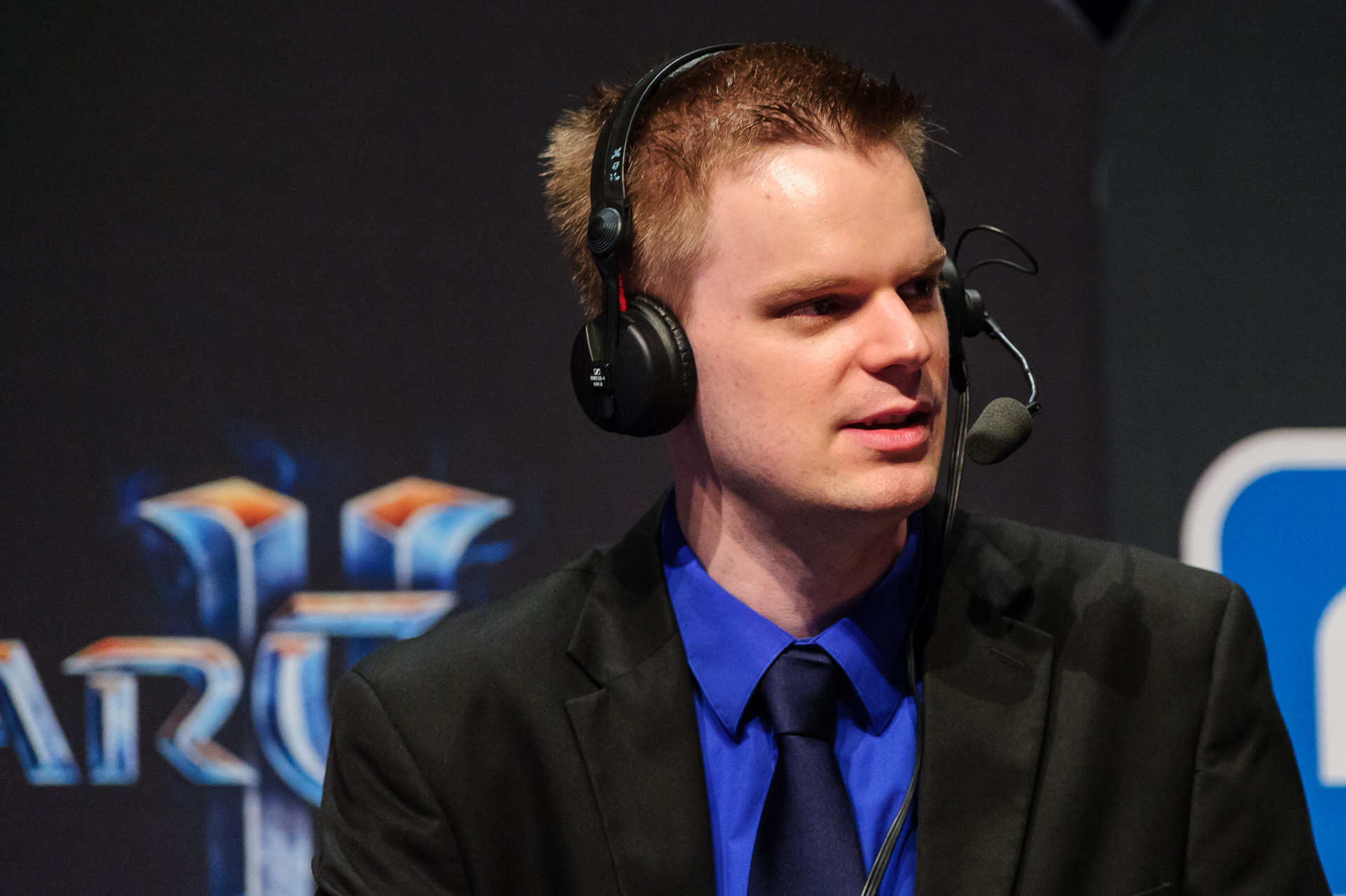
- Lamond at the 2013 MLG Winter Championship
- Born: Michael Lamond; May 4, 1987 (age 39); Bakersfield, California
- Other name: Husky
- Occupations: YouTuber; esports commentator; director; producer; voice actor
- Years active: 2010–present (general career), 2010–2015 (esports commentating)
- Known for: Nerd Alert, StarCraft II casting
- Partners: Rosanna Pansino (2012–2026)

Michael Lamond (born May 4, 1987), more commonly known by his online alias Husky or HuskyStarcraft, is a former sports commentator, YouTuber, director, producer, and voice actor. He is best known for his work in esports, most notably for his commentating on StarCraft II, a video game published by Blizzard Entertainment. He regularly appeared as a commentator at StarCraft tournaments, with his commentary being viewable through various YouTube channels.

In early 2015, Lamond quit sports commentating. In late 2018, after a four-year hiatus, Husky took down his old YouTube channel, which as of March 2019 had over 489 million views. He currently has a new channel on the platform and formerly worked with Rosanna Pansino on Nerdy Nummies.

== Early life ==
Mike "Husky" Lamond was born in Bakersfield, California. He lived in Nipomo in San Luis Obispo County for the first 11 years of his life. He later moved with his family to Beavercreek, Oregon, where his parents and older brother still reside.

== Career ==
=== Esports commentating and hosting ===
[A good shoutcast] is really up to personal preference. Some people prefer a highly analytical and educational form of casting to improve their game, while others prefer a more casual or energetic feel. I think it really shows in the quality of the cast if the person doing it loves what they are doing and really wants to help spread the popularity of StarCraft.

— Husky on shoutcasting

An avid fan of real-time strategy video games, Husky first learned of StarCraft when he was 11 years old. He stated that he played for 12 years, and spent most of his time on Blizzard's online server Battle.net, accumulating several thousand played matches. Husky began following the electronic sports community when he discovered GOM TV, a streaming service in South Korea that broadcast StarCraft gameplay from professional gamers. This prompted him to begin a YouTube channel where he provided his own commentary on StarCraft: Brood War professional competition. The channel started expanding beyond Husky's own expectations, and at one point Husky was uploading around 100 videos per month. While his channel became popular among other StarCraft: Brood War commentators, he gained a meteoric rise when he decided to exclusively commentate on StarCraft II: Wings of Liberty matches with the game's beta release in February 2010.

Mike Lamond deleted his YouTube channel because being an esport talker he had stopped for mental health reasons and it had started to damage his vocal cords as well as his voice.

During the beta, Husky collaborated with fellow commentator and friend HD to host the HDH Invitational, a StarCraft II tournament consisting of 16 of the top professionals StarCraft II gamers. The tournament was played in an entirely virtual environment over the Battle.net server, and the games were later broadcast on YouTube. The tournament was sponsored and cash prizes were awarded.

In July 2010 Husky and HD along with several other game casters participated in the launch of a new YouTube channel titled The Game Station which seeks to emulate an ESPN-Esque presentation of gaming videos of all genres. The channel quickly grew in size, and its success has been attributed partly to Husky's own success on YouTube. Later that year, Husky moved to Los Angeles to pursue a full-time job working at The Game Station. HuskyStarcraft has cast a number of professional tournaments, starting with the HDH invitational and his most recent being the Red Bull Training Grounds Santa Monica on June 21, 2013.

In mid-April 2013, Husky teamed up with TheWarpzone and Stage5TV (The Red5 Studios media channel) to create a music video which was a parody of Maroon 5's "One More Night" titled "One More Fight."

To explain his view of why StarCraft is an exemplary video game for both casting and spectating, Husky stated, "Nearly every single person I have introduced competitive StarCraft to has completely fallen in love with it... The level of skill and mental precision required to play StarCraft 2 at the highest levels is completely mind-blowing. This is why it is an extremely fun sport to watch." Husky's commentary style has been described as matching the fast-paced progression of the game, with him often losing his breath at eventful moments. This is contrasted with HD's more composed and analytical approach to casting. In describing his passion for video games and the electronic sports scene, Husky stated, "Gaming has always been more than just a hobby for me. I wouldn't say it's a lifestyle, but I just get so much joy out of it that I will forever try and be involved with it as much as possible... No outside job will ever limit me when it comes to gaming."

On 26 September 2012 Genna Bain announced the creation of Axiom ESports, with TotalBiscuit and Husky as the team's sponsors and CranK, now AxCrank, as their first player.

In 2013, Husky was on the crew for directing the internet series Broken Quest, in which he self starred as the main character as well as starring Rosanna Pansino in the lead female role.

Throughout his career of gaming and casting he has also produced and co-produced music video parodies and originals with Kurt Hugo Schneider under the name of Nerd Alert such as Banelings (Justin Bieber - Baby Parody), Nerdy and I know it (LMFAO - Sexy and I know it Parody), Void Rays (Rebecca Black - Friday Parody) and Dear Peach (Luigi Love Song).

=== Retirement from esports and other ventures ===
In early 2015, Husky stopped casting esports tournaments and submitting content to his YouTube channel. He appeared several times on Rosanna Pansino’s YouTube channel as a helper for her "Nerdy Nummies" series mid-2013. He continues to work as a manager, director, and producer per his Twitter bio. In early November 2016, Husky posted several Twitter posts referencing Starcraft, prompting many followers to speculate about his return to commentating. However, this never materialized; and, in 2018, he took down his YouTube content. In May 2019 he revealed that he quit esport casting due to medical reasons, specifically citing damage to his vocal cords due to casting work. Husky has since revived his Youtube channel, and changed it into more of a lifestyle channel, as he now frequently focuses his channel on his life with Pansino.

== Personal life ==
In November 2018, YouTuber Rosanna Pansino revealed that she and Lamond were dating. In August 2026, Pansino revealed via Instagram story that she and Lamond ended their relationship. Pansino filed for a temporary restraining order against Lamond, alleging a long-term pattern of extreme coercive control, repetitive sexual assault, isolation from her family, and intense monitoring.

== Filmography ==
- Broken Quest (2013; director, voice actor)
- Nerdy Nummies (2013–2026; director, producer, manager, guest)
