= MatPat =

American internet personality (born 1986)

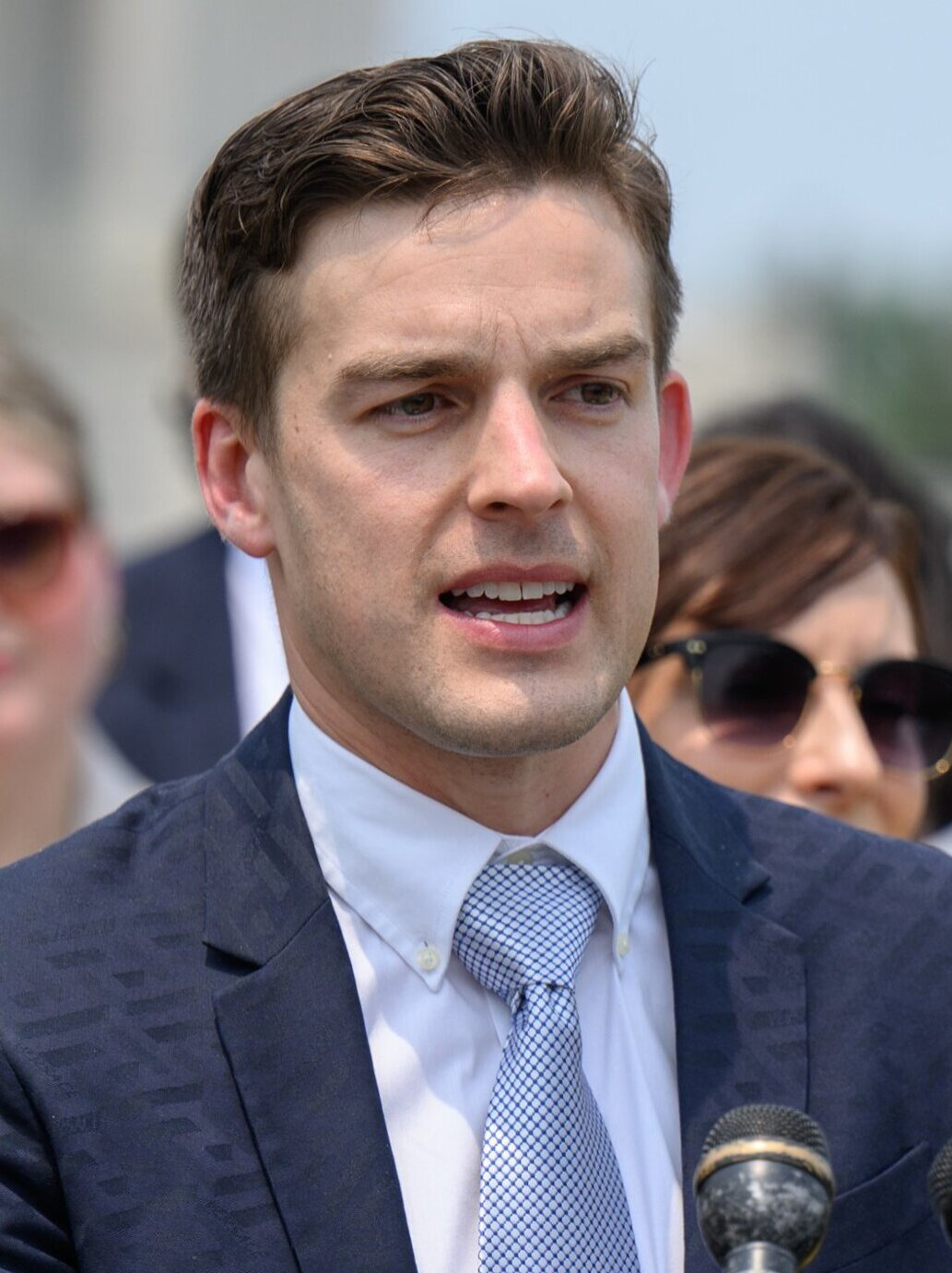
- MatPat in 2025
- Born: Matthew Robert Patrick; November 15, 1986 (age 40); Medina, Ohio, U.S.
- Education: Duke University (BA)
- Occupations: Internet celebrity; digital actor analytics strategist; consultant
- Organization(s): Co-founder, president and CEO of Theorist Media
- Spouse: Stephanie Cordato (m. 2012)
- Children: 1

YouTube information
- Channels: PatChat; Former host of: The Game Theorists; The Film Theorists; The Food Theorists; The Style Theorists; GTLive (Now known as TheoryCast)
- Years active: 2009–present
- Genre: Gaming
- Subscribers: 44 million (combined) (Note: Subscribers, broken down by channel: 19.6 million (The Game Theorists); 13.4 million (The Film Theorists); 5.54 million (The Food Theorists); 2.76 million (The Style Theorists); 3.56 million (GTLive))
- Views: 10 billion (combined) (Note: Views, broken down by channel: 4.76 billion (The Game Theorists); 3.59 billion (The Film Theorists); 1.23 billion (The Food Theorists); 412 million (The Style Theorists); 967 million (GTLive))
- MatPat's voice Recorded March 2020
- Last updated: October 19, 2026

Matthew Robert Patrick (born November 15, 1986), known professionally as MatPat, is an American internet personality and YouTuber. Patrick is the creator and former host of the YouTube series Game Theorists, and its spin-off channels Film Theorists, Food Theorists, and Style Theorists, each analyzing various video games, films alongside TV series and web series, food, and fashion respectively. In addition to the creation of his channels, Patrick narrated the majority of the videos presented on his channels before his departure.

Patrick has also created the gaming channel GTLive and hosted the YouTube Premium series MatPat's Game Lab and the 2023 Streamy Awards. As of May 2024, MatPat has amassed over 40 million subscribers, as well as over ten billion total views across all five of his channels. He departed the channels as a regular host in March 2024, although he continued to make minor appearances and host GTLive until October 2024. In June 2025, he helped establish the Creator Economy Caucus in the United States House of Representatives. In November 2026, he returned to content creation on YouTube with the discussion-based channel PatChat, alongside his wife Stephanie.

== Early life and education ==
Matthew Robert Patrick was born on November 15, 1986, in Medina, Ohio, to Linda (née Kosarek) and Robert "Bob" Patrick. He has Polish, Czech, and Slovak ancestry. He was nicknamed "MatPat" by his friends in sixth grade. An only child, Patrick was interested in video games, theater, and school early on. He was the valedictorian of his high school and received an academic scholarship to Duke University, graduating in 2009 with a double major in theater and psychology with a concentration in neuroscience.

== Internet career ==
To fulfill his dream of becoming an actor, Patrick moved to New York after graduating and performing in theater productions to little success, spending two years unemployed. His first YouTube videos were auditions for stage plays. In 2011, he decided to revamp his channel as a "portfolio" which could demonstrate to potential employers his ability to write, research, and edit videos online. Inspired by an Extra Credits episode on tangential learning, Patrick uploaded the first episode of Game Theory on April 18, 2011. It discussed the idea of time portals and quantum mechanics in the 1995 video game Chrono Trigger.

The channel slowly gained subscribers and his videos were posted on the front pages of sites such as ScrewAttack and GameTrailers. In 2012, he introduced two new segments hosted by fellow YouTubers Gaijin Goombah and Ronnie Edwards (the latter of these two would also become Game Theory's first editor), and Austin Hourigan's "The SCIENCE!". In 2015, he launched the spin-off channel Film Theory, which covers movies and television. This channel reached over one million subscribers in a month.

He occasionally uploaded videos commenting on the gaming market and gamers, as well as on other matters that he deemed noteworthy. Patrick started a Let's Play series called GTLive on August 26, 2015, where he posts gameplay and video reactions with his wife Stephanie. Starting on October 3, 2016, the Monday streams became part of YouTube Gaming Primetime, and were therefore scheduled for 3 pm to 5 pm PST. It also included a voting mechanism, which can be used by Patrick to conduct quick polls. As of March 2022, GTLive had 2.94 million subscribers and over 649 million views. As of 2022, the GTLive channel continues to upload mostly unedited, pre-recorded content.

On June 8, 2016, Patrick posted via his YouTube channel a new show, MatPat's Game Lab, on Google's paid subscription service, YouTube Premium. The show mainly focused on placing video game players in real-life scenarios mimicking scenarios that occur in video games, such as bomb defusing, parkour, survival and military training. Despite his interest in developing a second season, YouTube did not announce any further development into the project. He was also a part of the YouTube Premium series Scare PewDiePie (2016), created by PewDiePie, and the third season of Escape the Night (2018), created by Joey Graceffa, in addition to cameo appearances in Markiplier's YouTube Original films A Heist with Markiplier (2019) and In Space with Markiplier (2022). On May 29, 2016, MatPat and eleven other YouTubers met with Pope Francis for an hour. MatPat asked the Pope to encourage others to "fight for what's right" and gifted him a copy of Undertale (2015), saying that its recurrent theme of mercy fits the Pope's proclamation that 2016 would be the "year of mercy for the Catholic church".

=== Growth of Theory channels ===
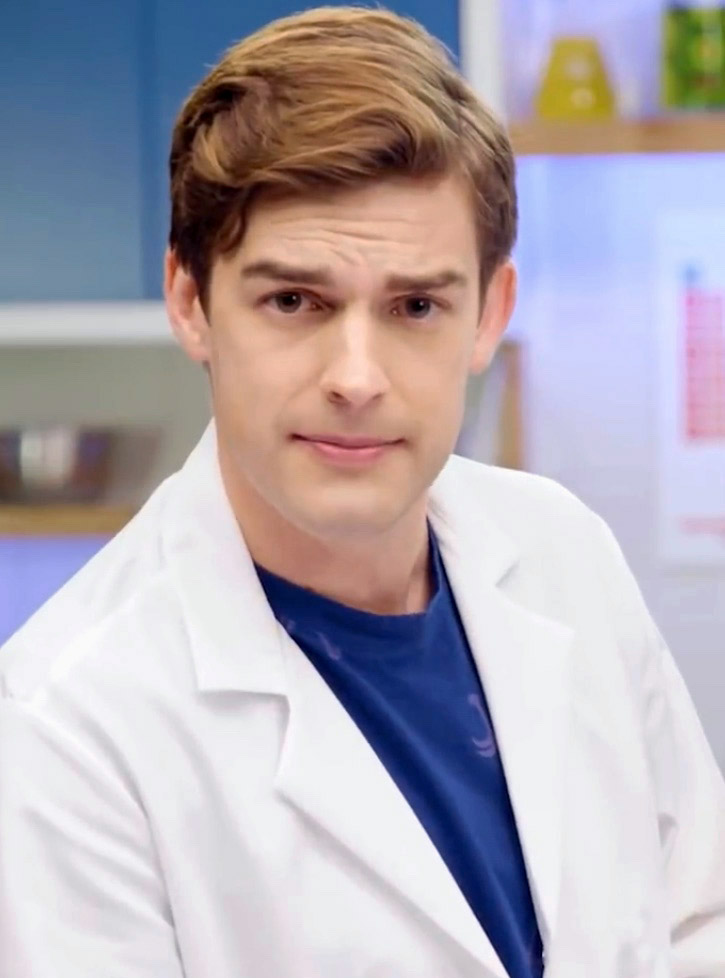
Patrick in 2020

In 2019, The Game Theorists held a 9-hour charity livestream that generated $1.3 million for St. Jude Children's Research Hospital. The stream included guests Markiplier, TheOdd1sOut, Rosanna Pansino, Scott Cawthon, and others. Two other charity streams were held for St. Jude in 2020 and 2021, respectively.

The third Theory channel, and fourth overall, The Food Theorists, began releasing videos in July 2020. The Food Theorists, using the same style as its predecessors, blends food science with psychology, physiology, and conspiracy. The channel was being developed for two years before its launch. As of October 2022, The Food Theorists had 4 million subscribers and over 499 million views. It had reached 1 million subscribers exactly a week after launch and had then gained another million over the succeeding 4 months.

On December 20, 2022, a fourth Theory channel, and fifth overall, was announced on the Game Theorists channel, along with the purchase of their company Theorist Media by startup Lunar X. On February 18, 2023, The Style Theorists was launched. Like the other channels, it focuses on the science, math, history, psychology, and mystery of fashion. On August 27, 2023, Patrick hosted the Streamy Awards, which scored 15 million views across digital platforms in its first 48 hours, beating the 2021 record of 9.7 million views as the most-watched show in its 13-year history.

On January 9, 2024, Patrick announced in a video titled "Goodbye Internet" that he would step down from hosting the channels on March 9, and would be replaced by a different member of the Theorist team for each channel, while still retaining a creative role and making occasional appearances on the channels, along with GTLive, until mid-2024. While he joked that his decision was inspired by Tom Scott, who had recently ended his decade-long run of posting weekly videos, he said that he and his wife had been working towards the change for years. They also chose a ten-week timeframe when announcing his retirement.

=== Other media and collaborations ===
Patrick was involved in the web series Terrain of Magical Expertise. He gained the series more attention and exposure by uploading a remastered version of the first episode on the channel on October 1, 2013, and then providing a platform for the series. In 2016, he hosted the go90 reality series The Runner. In 2017, Patrick and his wife Stephanie participated in Nintendo's Pokkén Tournament DX Invitational, an event held during E3 2017. He was paired with Allister Singh, the only pro-Pokkén Tournament player in the event. His team eventually won the tournament. MatPat voiced Computron in the animated series Transformers: Titans Return (2017). In 2019, MatPat partnered with Nickelodeon to make the show Fact or Nicktion. MatPat is a co-producer of the Broadway play Grey House.

His videos about the video game series Five Nights at Freddy's have made him prominent within the series' fandom, which is known for its dedication to theorizing about the underlying narrative of the series. He made a cameo appearance in its 2023 film adaptation as a waiter. In 2024, he collaborated with the series for a Youtooz figure and pins. In total, he made 68 theory videos on the series. In May 2024, MatPat appeared on an episode of Wired's "Web's Most Searched Questions" series. Also in 2024, MatPat co-produced a West End musical adaptation of the anime Your Lie in April. In 2025, he was the executive producer of the musical's cast album, which was also co-produced by his wife Stephanie. Also in 2025, he served as the voice for Toy Bonnie in the Five Nights at Freddy's 2 film. In 2026, he appeared as a main character in indie horror game Terrible Lizards. Also in 2026, it was announced that he would develop a feature film version of horror game series Amanda the Adventurer for Blumhouse Productions.

In November 2026, Patrick returned to YouTube following his retirement and began a new channel entitled PatChat, co-hosted with his wife.

=== Creator Economy Caucus ===
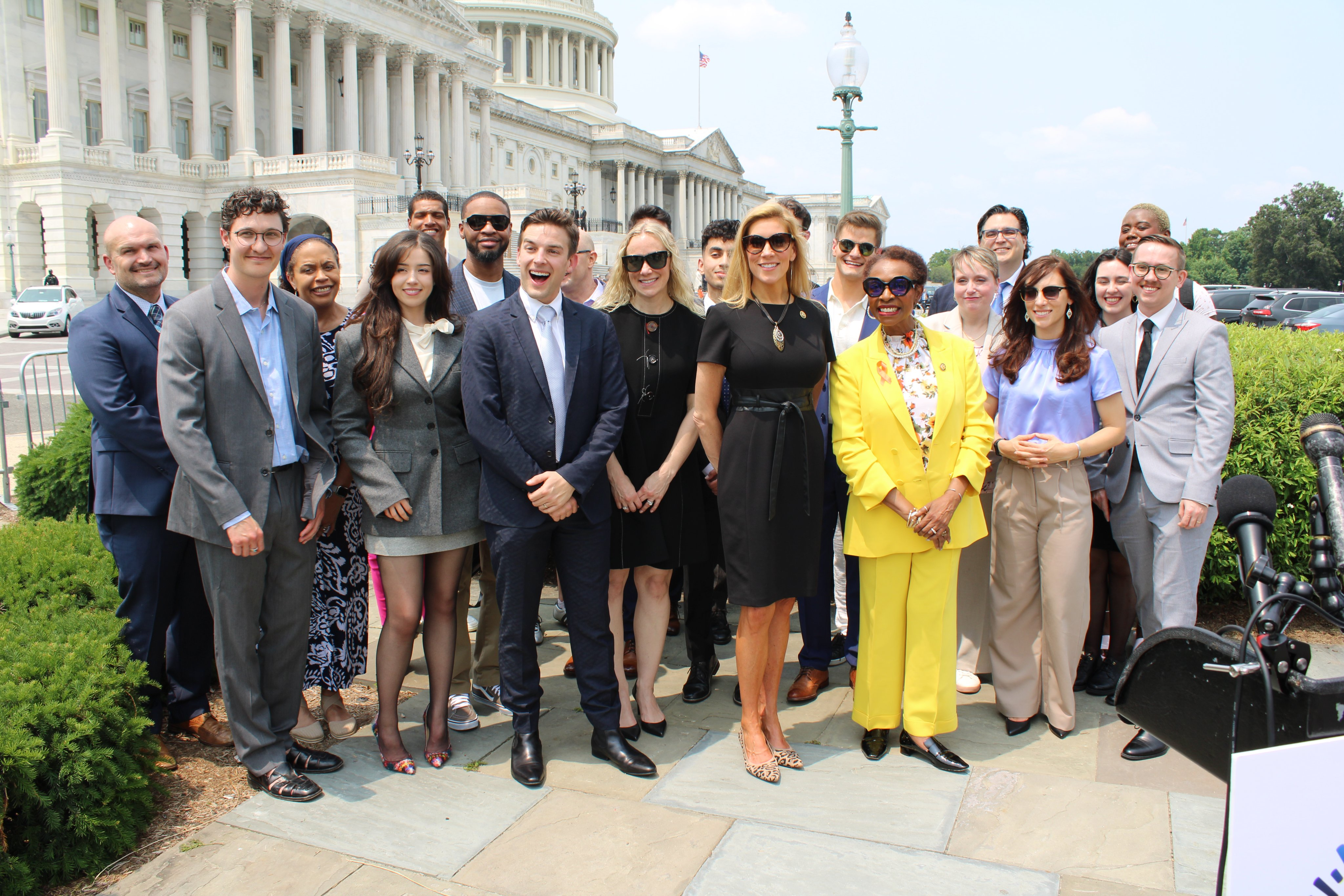
MatPat (third from left in front line) with other content creators and Representatives Beth Van Duyne and Yvette Clarke at the Creator Economy Caucus launch in June 2025.

On June 10, 2025, Patrick announced the creation of the Creator Economy Caucus in the United States House of Representatives, which he described as "a bipartisan group where creators can work alongside lawmakers to ensure legislation is timely and relevant for the Internet age." According to MatPat, his initiative was supported by around 10 representatives.

== Personal life ==
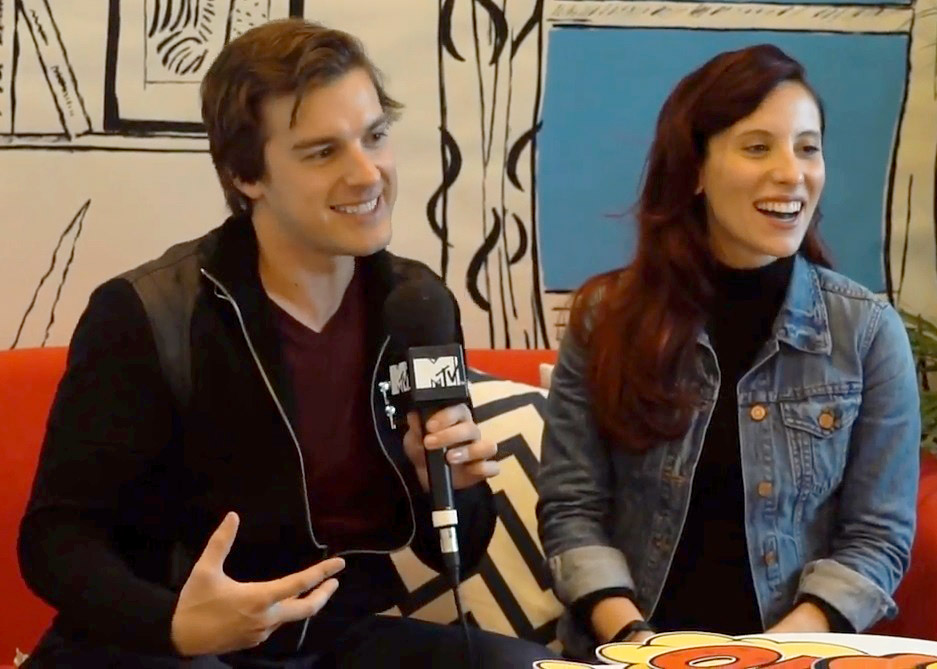
MatPat with his wife Stephanie in 2018

Patrick met Stephanie (née Cordato) while studying at Duke University. The two became close after creating a Legend of Zelda parody called "The Epic of Stew". They married on May 19, 2012, and had a son in 2018. As of 2020 the family divides their time between living in California and North Carolina.

== Awards and nominations ==
Year	Award	Category	Recipient(s)	Result	Ref.
2015	Streamy Awards	Gaming	The Game Theorists	Nominated	
2015	Streamy Awards	Editing	The Game Theorists	Nominated	
2016	Shorty Awards	Tech and Innovation: Gaming	The Game Theorists	Nominated	
2016	Streamy Awards	Show of the Year	The Game Theorists	Nominated	
2016	Streamy Awards	Gaming	The Game Theorists	Won	
2016	Streamy Awards	Non-Fiction	MatPat's Game Lab	Nominated	
2016	Streamy Awards	Virtual Reality and 360	MatPat's Game Lab	Won	
2017	Shorty Awards	Tech and Innovation: Gaming	Himself	Nominated	
2017	Streamy Awards	Editing	The Game Theorists	Won	
2017	Streamy Awards	Immersive	The Global Gamer	Nominated	
2018	Streamy Awards	Subject: Pop Culture	Game Theory	Nominated	
2018	Streamy Awards	Editing	Game Theory	Nominated	
2019	Streamy Awards	Gaming	The Game Theorists	Won	
2021	Streamy Awards	Writing	The Game Theorists	Won	

== YouTube channels ==
Channel name	Main host	Topic	Release date	Subscribers	Number of videos
The Game Theorists	MatPat (2011–2024); Tom Robinson (2024–)	Solving the mysteries of games	August 22, 2009	19.6 million	824
The Film Theorists	MatPat (2014–2024); Forrest Lee (2024–)	Learning the secrets of films	May 12, 2014	13.2 million	540
The Food Theorists	MatPat (2020–2024); Santiago "Santi" Massa (2024–)	Explaining theories about food	May 29, 2020	5.5 million	267
The Style Theorists	MatPat (2023–2024); Amy Roberts (2024–)	Exploring the science around fashion	February 18, 2023	2.78 million	166
GTLive	MatPat (2015–2024); Ash (2024–)	Playing and analyzing video games	August 26, 2015	3.71 million	1,453
LoreFi	N/A	A lo-fi channel with an ARG narrative	July 13, 2024	112,000	4
PatChat	MatPat (2026–)	Discussions on contemporary topics	November 12, 2026	1.42 million	2

== Filmography ==
Year	Title	Role	Notes
2011–2024	The Game Theorists	Himself	533 episodes
2015	How to Beat a Monkey at Chess	Himself	Music video by Random Encounters
2015	Mangled	Himself	Music video by NateWantsToBattle
2015	LORE in a Minute!	Himself	Episode: "LORE: Dragon Ball Z Lore in a Minute!"
2015–2020	The Completionist	Himself	3 episodes
2015–2024	The Film Theorists	Himself	425 episodes
2016	FNAF the Musical	Phone Guy/William Afton	Music video by Random Encounters
2016	MatPat's Game Lab	Himself	YouTube Original; main role
2016	CaptainSparklez	Himself	Episode: "HELIUM RAP BATTLE VS MATPAT"
2016	Scare PewDiePie	Himself	YouTube Original; 2 episodes
2017	Death Battle	Keith	Voice role; "Power Rangers (Megazord) VS Voltron"
2017	NERDY NUMMIES	Himself	Episode: "NINTENDO SWITCH COOKIES ft. MatPat!"
2017	GUMMY FOOD vs REAL FOOD!	Himself	2 episodes
2017	Transformers: Titans Return	Computron	Voice role
2017	Bendy and the Ink Musical	Bendy	Voice role; Music video by Random Encounters
2017	Sonic Forces Academy	Himself	
2018	Cuphead the Musical	Dr. Kahl, Wally Warbles, Willy Warbles	Voice role; Music video by Random Encounters
2018	Food Court	Himself	YouTube Original; Episode: "Food Court ft. MatPat"
2018	Transformers: Power of the Primes	Swoop	Voice role
2018	The FNaF Show	Himself	Episode: Season 2 – Episode 4 ft. MatPat
2018–2019	Escape the Night	The detective	14 episodes
2019	A Heist with Markiplier	Hermit	
2019	FNAF the Musical: Web of Lies	Phone Guy/William Afton	Music video by Random Encounters
2019–2023	Pitch Meeting	Himself	2 episodes
2020	What's Your Favorite Scary Movie?	Himself	Episode: "MatPat on THE BLAIR WITCH PROJECT!"
2020–2024	The Food Theorists	Himself	188 episodes
2021	Instant Influencer with ZHC	Himself	YouTube Original; Episode: "Best Giant Art Wins $100,000"
2021	Bendy and the Wolf	Bendy	Voice role; Music video by Random Encounters
2021	Hero Mode	Himself	
2021	Disco Giraffe and Biker Jellyfish		1 episode
2021	Big Change	Himself	Episode: "MatPat's Secret To Working From Home"
2021	Dad	Himself	3 episodes
2021–2022	FootofaFerret	Himself	Voice role; 2 episodes
2022	Markiplier	Himself	Episode: "PowerWash Pals: MatPat from Game Theory"
2022	In Space with Markiplier	Theory crew (in Part 1)	
2022	In Space with Markiplier	Mack (in Part 2)	
2023	Five Nights at Freddy's	Ness	Credited as Sparky's Diner waiter; reference to episode of Game Theory: "Undertale – Sans's SECRET Identity!"
2023–2024	The Style Theorists	Himself	46 episodes
2024	The Kill Count	Himself	Episode: "Five Nights at Freddy's (2023) KILL COUNT"
2024	WIRED Autocomplete Interview	Himself	Episode: "MatPat Answers the Web's Most Searched Questions | WIRED"
2024	Last Meal	Himself	Episode: "MatPat Eats His Last Meal"
2024	We Surprised MatPat With His Own Movie	Himself	
2024	FNAF the Musical: Dark Remains	Phone Guy/William Afton	Music video by Random Encounters
2024	FNAF the Musical: Shadows of Agony	Phone Guy/William Afton	Music video by Random Encounters
2024	MrBeast	Himself	Episode: "50 YouTubers Fight for $1,000,000"
2024	FNAF UNSOLVED	Himself	Episode: "MIDNIGHT MOTORIST"
2024	The Entire FNAF Timeline	Fredbear's Family Diner announcer	Voice role
2025	Five Nights at Freddy's 2	Toy Bonnie	Voice role

As producer

Year	Title	Notes
TBD	Amanda the Adventurer	Film producer in collaboration with Blumhouse Productions

=== Ludography ===
Year	Title	Role
2021	Terrain of Magical Expertise	Mattheorist

== Discography ==
=== Singles ===
==== As lead artist ====
Year	Title	Notes
2016	"Exotic Butters (Margarine Remix)"	
2020	"Who You Gonna Call?"	

==== As featured artist ====
Year	Title	Notes
2014	"Captain Planet Theme Song Cover" (The Warp Zone)	
2015	"How to Beat a Monkey at Chess" (Random Encounters featuring Markiplier and The Completionist)	
2015	"Pokémon Johto" (NateWantsToBattle)	
2016	"Game of Thrones" (Peter Hollens)	
2017	"A Series of Unfortunate Events Acapella" (The Warp Zone)	
2017	"Bendy and the Ink Musical" (Random Encounters)	
2018	"Cuphead the Musical" (Random Encounters featuring various)	
2018	"Pokémon Masters Are Broke" (Schmoyoho)	
2021	"Bendy and the Wolf" (Random Encounters)	
2022	"Obliterate" (Dad featuring Corey Graves)	
2022	"MUUUSIC MAN! (MatPat Remix)" (Dufixklusiv)	Archival recording
2023	"A Little Theorizing" (The Stupendium)	Archival recording
2024	"FNAF: Dark Remains" (Random Encounters)	
2024	"FREDDY" (CG5 featuring Black Gryph0n)	
2024	"FNAF KIDS" (The Chalkeaters featuring Black Gryph0n, DHeusta, The Stupendium, and OR3O)	

==== As executive producer ====
Year	Title	Notes
2025	Your Lie in April: The Musical: London Cast Recording	

== See also ==
- List of YouTubers
