= Pokimane =

Moroccan and Canadian influencer (born 1996)

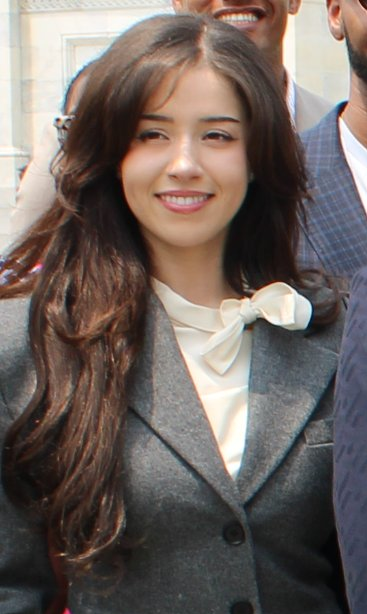
- Anys in 2025
- Born: Imane Anys; 14 May 1996 (age 30); Morocco
- Other names: Pokimanelol; Poki
- Citizenship: Morocco; Canada
- Occupations: Online streamer; YouTuber; podcaster; influencer
- Years active: 2013–present
- Title: Co-founder of OfflineTV

Twitch information
- Channel: pokimane
- Genres: Gaming; react
- Games: Fortnite; League of Legends; Valorant; Minecraft; Among Us
- Followers: 9.5 million

YouTube information
- Channel: Pokimane
- Genres: Gaming; Vlogging; ASMR; Podcasting
- Subscribers: 6.59 million
- Views: 93.13 million
- Last updated: 4 July 2026

Imane Anys (Note: /ˌɪˈmɑːn ˈæniːs/ IMAHN A-nees; Arabic: إيمان أنيس) (born 14 May 1996), known by her online handle Pokimane, (Note: The intended pronunciation of "Pokimane" is /ˈpoʊkimɑːn/ to parallel that of the franchise Pokémon. However, it is often pronounced /ˈpoʊkimeɪn/.) is a Moroccan and Canadian online streamer, YouTuber and influencer based in California. She is best known for gameplay and commentary livestreams on Twitch, most notably in Valorant and Fortnite. She is a co-founder of OfflineTV, an online social entertainment group of content creators. As of June 2026, with over 9.46 million followers, she is the most-followed female streamer on Twitch, and the 16th-most-followed overall.

== Early life ==
Imane Anys was born in Morocco on 14 May 1996. Her mother has Berber ancestry. Her parents, two academics, immigrated to Quebec, Canada, when she was four years old. She grew up in Ontario, Canada. She stated she speaks "two and a half" languages: English, French and Moroccan Arabic. French is her first language as she studied in a French school and it is also a language spoken in Morocco.

While she described her Moroccan Arabic proficiency as "a little bit", she continues to improve. She learned English at school. In middle school, Anys began playing massively multiplayer online games such as MapleStory and Endless Online, where she focused on customization and socializing with other players. Anys studied chemical engineering at McMaster University but later dropped out to pursue her streaming career full-time.

== Career ==
=== Twitch streaming ===
Anys created her Twitch account in June 2013. She began streaming later that year with a $250 PC she bought on Kijiji after reaching Platinum rank in League of Legends. The name Pokimane is a portmanteau of Pokémon and her name, Imane.

She gained 450,000 followers on Twitch in 2017, earning her account a place within the 100 most followed on the platform. As a result of her account's rise on the platform in 2017, the Shorty Awards named her as the Best Twitch Streamer of the year. The Shorty Awards detailed that her gameplay and commentary on the popular game League of Legends propelled her to popularity on Twitch. Anys had a cameo appearance in a League of Legends trailer announcing a new game mode.

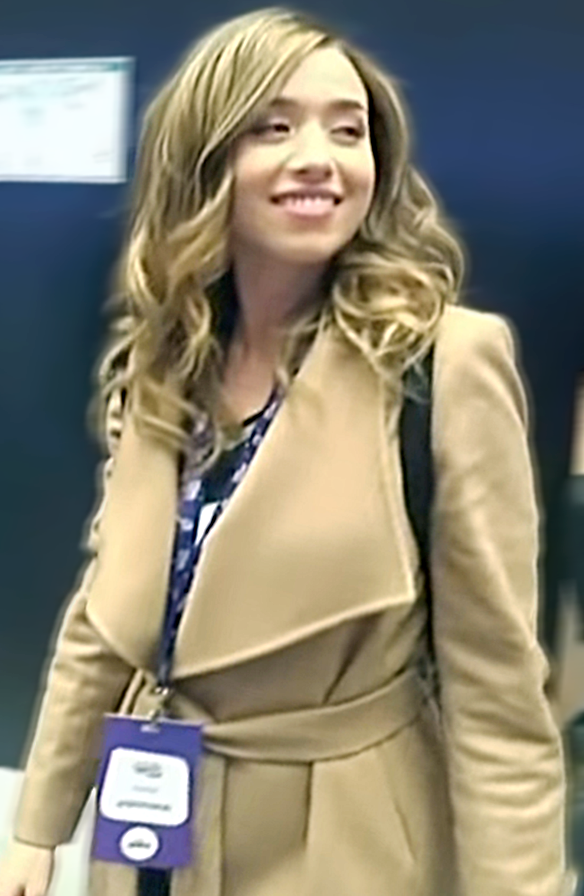
Anys in April 2019

Anys has been known to stream gameplay and commentary of Fortnite, which she first streamed as part of a sponsorship. At E3 in 2018, Epic Games, the developers of Fortnite, arranged a pro–am event. The event paired streamers with mainstream celebrities in a match of Fortnite's Battle Royale mode; Anys was paired with rapper Desiigner but shortly before the event, he was replaced with basketball player Josh Hart. In mid-March 2019, Anys addressed the declining number of Fortnite streams on her channel, stating that she needed to "think about what I like or dislike about the content that I've been making." On 19 January 2020, Pokimane announced her own official Fortnite emote.

Tech news website Digital Trends detailed that Anys frequently interacts with her audience and described her "laidback but enthusiastic personality" as "perfectly suited to long-form streams." Aside from streaming gaming content, Anys also podcasts and streams miscellaneous real-world moments.

As one of the more popular streamers on the platform, Twitch has directly partnered with Anys. In July 2018, Twitch selected her as one of 15 ambassadors for the 2018 iteration of their TwitchCon event. Later that month, Twitch also scheduled Anys as a partner for their Twitch Creator Camp, a series of broadcasts and articles designed to help content creators build successful channels. In March 2020, Anys signed a multi-year exclusivity with Twitch.

In December 2021, Social Blade listed Anys as the 9th-most-followed user on Twitch, with over 8.5 million followers. In late October 2020, Anys collaborated with U.S. representatives Alexandria Ocasio-Cortez and Ilhan Omar along with several other notable streamers including Disguised Toast and HasanAbi for a session of Among Us as part of a get-out-the-vote initiative for the 2020 United States presidential election.

Anys was named a featured honoree in the 2021 Forbes 30 Under 30 under the category of "Games", which noted her prominence as the largest female streamer on Twitch and as one of the founders of OfflineTV. She had 8.5 million followers on Twitch as of July 2021.

On 8 January 2022, Anys' Twitch account was suspended for 48 hours midway through an Avatar: The Last Airbender watch stream following a DMCA claim from ViacomCBS. Later in the month, Anys' stream was hate-raided by viewers of JiDion. He was later banned, which received the attention of streamer Ninja, who stated he would use his connections to get the ban reversed. Anys criticized this response from Ninja, particularly calling out Ninja's use of the word bitches when speaking on the issue. Anys and JiDion have since made amends. Later in February 2022, Anys re-signed with Twitch.

On 30 January 2024, Anys announced that she would stop streaming on Twitch stating that she was "done with Twitch's messy behavior", citing the changes that the company has made in recent years. However, she has continued to stream. On 22 October 2024, Anys and fellow streamer Valkyrae hosted a livestream featuring U.S. senator Bernie Sanders in support of the Kamala Harris 2024 presidential campaign, along with streamers AustinShow and Sykkuno, and other popular figures such as Hank Green, Mark Cuban and Mark Hamill.

=== YouTube ===
In addition to streaming on the Twitch platform, Anys also has multiple YouTube channels: Pokimane, Pokimane Too, Pokimane VODS, Poki ASMR, and imane. In 2021, Anys publicly announced that she had stopped doing ASMR, due to the amount of time and dedication it takes to make ASMR videos. The Pokimane channel features edited gaming clips from streams while Pokimane Too includes unrelated clips of her gaming content, vlogs, and podcast.

On the Pokimane VODS channel, full unedited VOD clips of streams are uploaded. The Poki ASMR channel featured videos that are part of a broader YouTube community of ASMR content, though Anys has ceased uploading on the channel. In 2021, Anys launched a new channel entitled simply 'imane' which covers more personal topics and vlogs rather than gaming-related topics.

Anys was also a member of OfflineTV, a collaborative YouTube channel made up of content creators. Speaking about the channel, Anys stated, "it's not fun being a streamer and living alone, so we decided to come together in a way so we not only keep each other company but we can also collab and actually do good work and content for everyone else." On 19 May 2023, OfflineTV announced her departure from the group via a "graduation" video, though she stayed affiliated with the group after.

== Other ventures ==
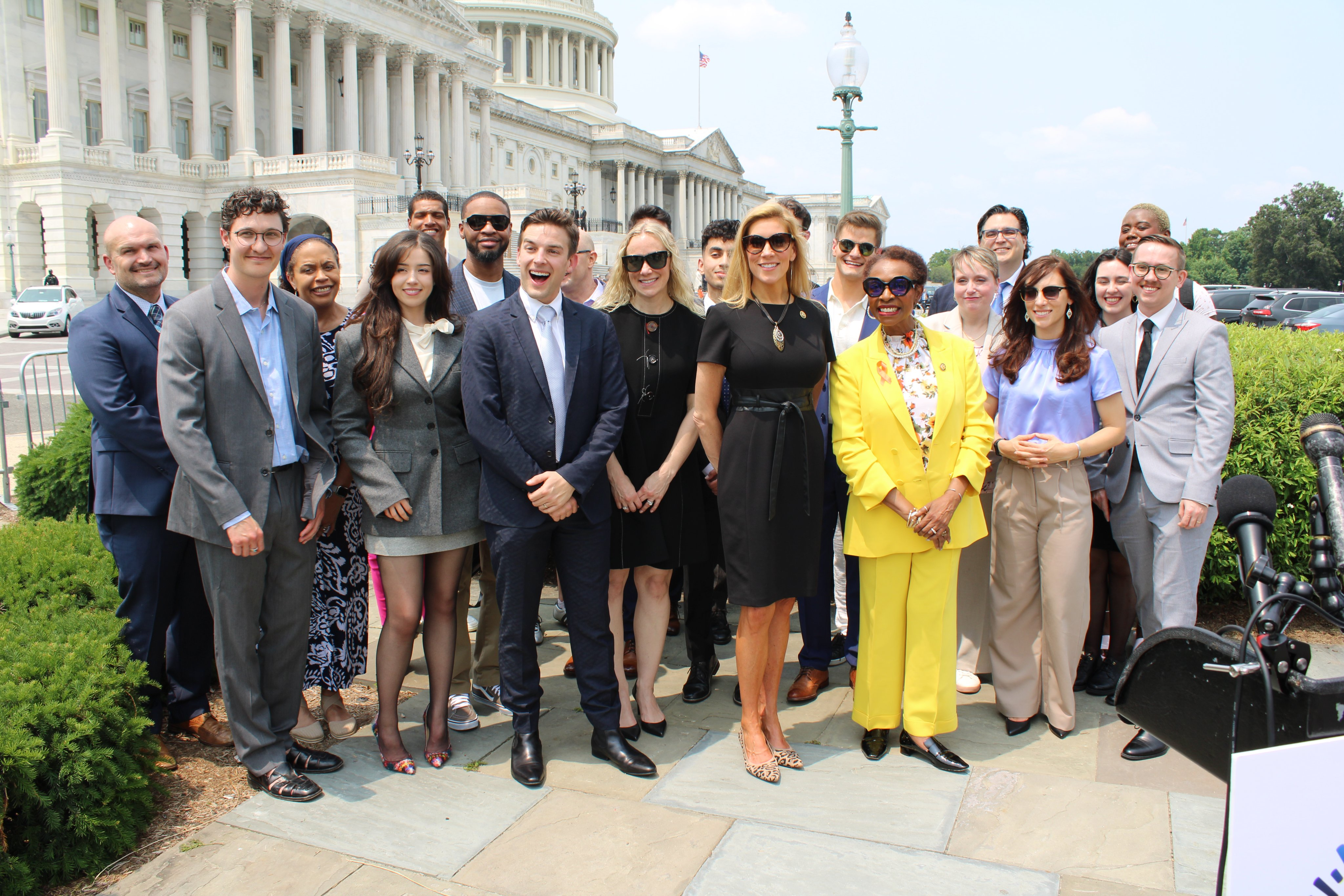
Content creators (including Matthew "MatPat" Patrick, Kati Morton, and Anys) with Representatives Beth Van Duyne and Yvette Clarke at the launch of the Creator Economy Caucus in June 2025

Outside of streaming, Pokimane has a large following across several social media platforms. As of April 2026, she has 6 million followers on Instagram, 7.3 million followers on TikTok, 6.6 million subscribers on YouTube, and 4 million followers on X.

In October 2018, fellow YouTubers Markiplier and Jacksepticeye launched the clothing line Cloak, aimed at the gaming community. Anys joined Cloak as a partner and creative director in 2020.

In October 2021, it was announced that Anys had helped launch a talent management and brand consulting firm called RTS, where she will serve as the Chief Creative Officer. Anys later quietly departed RTS "two or three years after launching", having sold her stake in the company for "at least six figures".

On 13 November 2023, Anys announced she launched Myna, a company that sells "healthy snack alternative" cookies. One four-pack of the company's midnight mini cookies product were sold for $28, drawing criticism from some, calling the cookies overpriced. On 18 November, during a livestream, she responded to the criticism stating, "When people are like 'oh my God, $28 for cookies'. It's four bags, that's $7 per bag. I know, I know, math is hard when you're an idiot. But, if you're a broke boy, just say so." Her usage of "broke" as an insult attracted further backlash.

On 12 December 2023, Anys launched her first podcast called Don't Tell Anyone. The podcast ended in June 2024, with Anys explaining "I ain't got more to say, I told all my stories". On 13 September 2024, Anys uploaded episode 1 of her new podcast, Sweet n Sour with Lilypichu, "A weekly podcast created and hosted by Pokimane and LilyPichu… real talks, sweet moments, and a dash of sour truths." After 68 episodes, on 25 April 2026, The Sweet N Sour X account announced that the podcast was ending.

On 17 January 2024, Anys made a special guest appearance at Samsung's biannual Galaxy Unpacked event, where she demonstrated the new gaming features of the S24 Series of devices' adaptive displays.

On 5 June 2025, the Creator Economy Caucus was announced at a press conference outside the Capitol Building. Anys was a participant in the launch, claiming she assisted in "recruiting congresspeople to the official creators caucus" on Instagram.

=== Acting ===
In October 2019, it was announced that Anys, among a number of other internet personalities, would appear in the film Free Guy, directed by Shawn Levy, which was released in August 2021. In August 2021, she appeared in the music video for Bella Poarch's song "Inferno". In March 2025, she starred in the music video for d4vd's song "What Are You Waiting For".

== Personal life ==
In May 2024, Anys disclosed her diagnosis with polyendocrine metabolic ovarian syndrome (PMOS).

Anys has not explicitly confirmed her religion, but has spoken about being spiritual and believing in God but not being religious, stating in a 2025 YouTube video that she doesn't want to share her religion as she doesn't want to have to be "the perfect role model" of that religion, a view similar to that which she had previously shared in an episode of her podcast. Anys has also discussed having an Islamic upbringing, and participates in Muslim traditions such as Ramadan and Eid al-Fitr.

As of October 2021, Anys resides in Los Angeles, California. She endorsed Kamala Harris in the 2024 United States presidential election.

== Filmography ==
=== Film ===
Year	Title	Role	Notes	Ref.
2021	Free Guy	Herself	Cameo appearance	

=== Music videos ===
Year	Title	Artist(s)	Ref.
2021	"Inferno"	Bella Poarch and Sub Urban	
2021	"Break Out"	MaiR	
2025	"What Are You Waiting For"	d4vd	

== Awards and nominations ==
Year	Ceremony	Category	Result	Ref.
2018	The Game Awards 2018	Content Creator of the Year	Nominated	
2018	10th Shorty Awards	Twitch Streamer of the Year	Won	
2018	8th Streamy Awards	Live Streamer	Nominated	
2020	10th Streamy Awards	Live Streamer	Nominated	
2021	Forbes 30 Under 30	Games	Included	
2021	2021 Streamer Awards	Best Valorant Streamer	Nominated	
2021	2021 Streamer Awards	Legacy Award	Won	
2021	2021 Canadian Game Awards	Best Personality	Won	
2022	12th Streamy Awards	Streamer of the Year	Nominated	
2022	2022 Canadian Game Awards	Best Streamer	Won	
2025	2025 Kids' Choice Awards	Favorite Gamer	Nominated	
2025	2025 Streamer Awards	Best Streamed Collab (with Katseye)	Nominated	

== See also ==
- List of most-followed Twitch channels
