= Creator Economy Caucus =

United States congressional caucus

- Co-Chairs: House: Beth Van Duyne (R); Yvette Clarke (D); Senate: John Kennedy (R); Cory Booker (D)
- Founded: June 5, 2025; 17 months ago
- Ideology: Content creators' interests Creator economy interests
- Colours: Red; Black

The Creator Economy Caucus (Note: Known as the Congressional Creators Caucus in the House, and as the Senate Creators Caucus in the Senate.) is a bipartisan caucus of U.S. lawmakers whose members work to support online content creators. It was founded during the 119th Congress in June 2025 by Representatives Beth Van Duyne and Yvette Clarke. Its creation was advised by YouTuber Matthew Patrick (also known as MatPat) and his wife, Stephanie Patrick.

== History ==
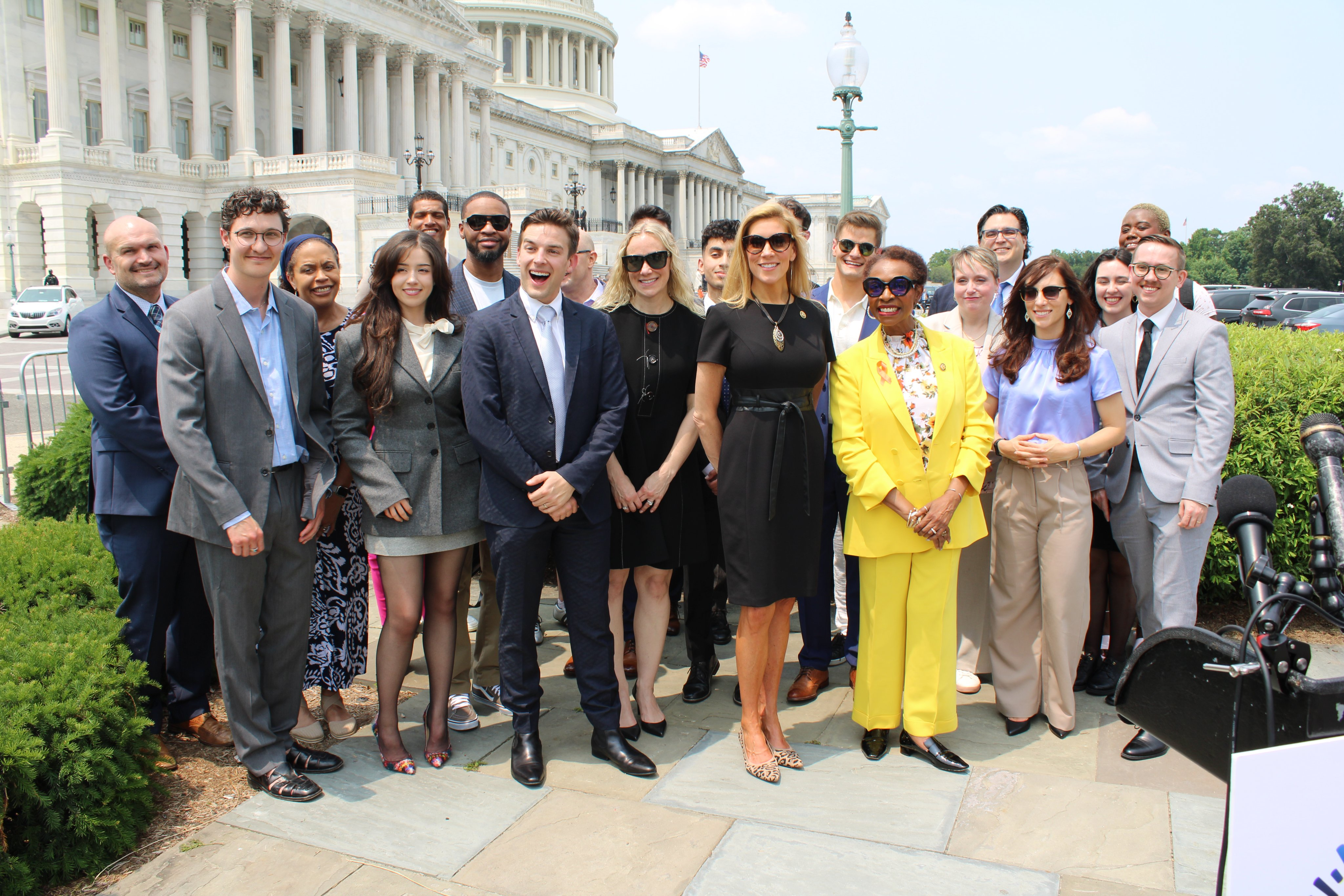
Content creators (including MatPat, Kati Morton, and Imane Anys) with Representatives Beth Van Duyne and Yvette Clarke at the caucus's launch in June 2025

The caucus was officially announced on June 5, 2025, at a press conference outside of the U.S. Capitol Building. Joining co-chairs Beth Van Duyne and Yvette Clarke was consultant YouTuber MatPat and his wife, Stephanie Patrick. Also present were executives from YouTube and Patreon, who announced support for the project.

In June of 2026, the Congressional Creator Caucus hosted the first Creator Row event on Capitol Hill, aimed at educating lawmakers and congressional staff on the digital creator economy.

On September 16, 2026, Senators Cory Booker and John Neely Kennedy formed the Senate Creators Caucus.

== Policy goals ==
During the group's initial announcement, MatPat identified the promotion of internet privacy legislation, AI ethics, child safety, and "algorithmic responsibility" as key goals that were to be addressed by the caucus. The caucus aims to, among other goals, develop a clearer tax code for content creators and their businesses.

== Membership ==
=== 119th Congress ===
The caucus claimed to have about ten members as of June 2025, with Beth Van Duyne and Yvette Clarke serving as co-chairs.
