= Star Trek: Phoenix =

- Genre: Science fiction Fan series
- Created by: Leo Roberts
- Developed by: Leo Roberts; Jön Johnson; Jeff Ayers
- Written by: Ben Andrews; James Lyle; Lorraine Montez; Leo Roberts; Brian Sipe; Roy Stanton
- Directed by: Sam Akina; Gale Benning
- Creative directors: Rob E. Welch; Gale Benning; Chris Collins-Lubin
- Starring: Ben Andrews; Ben Johnson; James Lyle; Roy Stanton; Elle Vianne Sonnet; Nicole Santora; S. Joe Downing; Vanessa Cobbs; Jesse Pattison
- Opening theme: Bradley Laina
- Ending theme: Steve Brush
- Composer: Bradley Laina
- Country of origin: United States
- Original language: English
- No. of seasons: 1
- No. of episodes: 1

Production
- Executive producers: Ben Andrews; Jön Johnson; Lorraine Montez; Leo Roberts
- Producers: S. Joe Downing; James Lyle; Adam Sonnet; Elle Sonnet; Gale Benning; Chris Collins-Lubin; Gina Lockhart; Rob Welch
- Production locations: Seattle, WA; Lynwood, WA
- Cinematography: Sam Graydon; Anthony Tackett
- Editors: Ryan Dunleavy; Jeff McGlinn
- Running time: 30 Minutes
- Production companies: Temporal Studios; Abundant Productions; Sonnet Realm Films

Original release
- Release: May 2, 2010

Star Trek: Phoenix is a Star Trek fan-created anthology series produced and filmed by Temporal Studios. The series was created by Leo Roberts and later developed by Leo Roberts, Jön Johnson and Star Trek author, Jeff Ayers. The story is set 42 years after Star Trek: Nemesis in the prime universe created by Gene Roddenberry and follows the crew of the Federation's first political flagship, the Ascension-Class starship USS Phoenix (NCX-101138).

The first episode, "Cloak & Dagger, Part I", was released on the Internet on May 2, 2010, and as of December 2015 ,"Cloak & Dagger, Part Two" remains suspended until the current lawsuit against the fan production Star Trek: Axanar by Paramount Pictures and CBS is resolved.

Along with an all-volunteer cast/crew production, several veterans of Star Trek including Academy Award-winning crew members from the J. J. Abrams reboot Star Trek and Star Trek: Into Darkness films worked on the project.

"Cloak & Dagger, Part One" was an official selection of the 2010 edition of the Maelstrom International Fantastic Film Festival in Seattle, Washington.

== Cast and crew ==
=== Regular characters ===
Character	Actor	Rank	Position
Bryce Avari	Ben Andrews	Captain	Captain and commanding officer of the starship Phoenix.
Talis Jaryn	Ben Johnson	Commander	First Officer | Species: half-human/half-Altusian.
Thomas Alden	James Lyle	Commander	Chief Medical Officer; close friend of Captain Avari.
T'Von	Roy Stanton	Ambassador	Federation Diplomatic Corp | Species: Romulan
Akelyn Solara	Elle Vianne Sonnet	Lt. Commander	Chief Engineer | Species: Von Ra
Yamora Vu'Shan	Nicole Santora	Lt. Commander	Chief Science Officer | Species: Sedesian
Arca Niran	S. Joe Downing	Lieutenant	Chief of Security/Chief Tactical Officer
Pelomar Laenah	Vanessa Cobbs	Lieutenant	Chief Navigator | Species: Meneán
Joben Karkko	Jesse Pattison	Lieutenant	Chief of Operations

=== Secondary characters ===
Character	Actor	Rank	Position
Ulti Natyra	Lorraine Montez	Major	SABRE Enemy Engagement Specialist | Species: Trill
Noah Croft	John Lynch	Colonel	USS Phoenix SABRE Commander
Tol Hadik	Rodrigo DeMedeiros	Councilor	Federation Council Member | Species: Trill
Krik	Leo Roberts	General	SABRE Commandant | Species: Ilayian

== Plot ==
=== Part I ===
After their diplomatic envoy crashes on the remote planet of Katrassii Prime, Captain Avari and the crew of the USS Phoenix embark on a dangerous mission to rescue them. Upon arrival in the Neutral Zone, the rescue team faces a labyrinth of mysteries while their true enemy lurks in the shadows. The crew of the Phoenix will sail into the unknown as the architect of their destruction leads them back to the beginning of their maiden voyage.

== Sequel ==
On October 23, 2015, Temporal Studios announced it was planning on producing Part II of "Cloak & Dagger" as a 90-minute audio drama to be released in mid-2016 in time for the franchise's 50th anniversary. The script was being written by creator/executive producer, Leo Roberts and the majority of the cast from Part I was returning to reprise their respective roles.

On January 1, 2016, the studio announced Part II was on "indefinite hold" due to the Star Trek: Axanar lawsuit filed on December 29, 2015 by Paramount Pictures and CBS.

On May 20, 2016, at the Star Trek fan event in Los Angeles, executive producer, J. J. Abrams and Star Trek Beyond director, Justin Lin announced the lawsuit against Axanar was being dropped. Official confirmation is pending and guidelines were being issued to fan productions but little information is currently available.
