= Autocomplete Interview =

Web series by Wired

- Thumbnail of the 2019 episode "Millie Bobby Brown, Finn Wolfhard & Noah Schnapp Answer the Web's Most Searched Questions"
- Genre: Interview
- No. of episodes: 366

Production
- Production company: Wired

Original release
- Network: YouTube
- Release: 2016 – present

Autocomplete Interview, also known as The Web's Most Searched Questions, is a celebrity interview series by the magazine Wired, released on YouTube. The interviews are not conducted by interviewers; instead, guests read a list of Google Search terms shown as autocomplete results for the guests' names. The series began in 2016 under the leadership of Joe Sabia of Wired's parent company, Condé Nast, and became one of the company's most successful series. It is one of the most popular online interview series, with over one billion views.

== Format ==
Autocomplete Interview episodes are interviews in which the questions are compiled based on the autocomplete results of a Google search for the guest's name, rather than being created by an interviewer. The guests are mostly actors and musicians, often conducted during press junkets.

Episode titles say that the guests "Answer the Web's Most Searched Questions", although autocomplete results do not equate to the most common searches, instead being determined by a proprietary algorithm. As the questions are based on search results, they are written in the third person and may be grammatically incorrect. For example, questions given to Anne Hathaway included "What is Anne Hathaway face shape" and "What does Anne Hathaway win an Oscar for". According to scholar Richard Norroy Graham, Autocomplete Interview, as well as other YouTube videos involving Google autocomplete, represent the common conception of autocomplete as a representation of the public.

The questions are written on a foam board and covered in tape for the guest to reveal. Guests look to the camera and read the questions to themselves, or, in episodes with multiple guests, alternate reading questions about each other. This differs from a typical interview in which guests face an interviewer, and there are no follow-up questions or comments. The format allows its guests to set the tone of their interviews. In the absence of an interviewer, interviewees sometimes address an intangible question-asker as "Internet", "Google", or "people". According to linguists Jung Hwi Roh and Iksoo Kwon, the unusual interview setting creates a framing in which interviewees can perceive such a person, despite there being no actual interaction. According to literary scholar Rebecca Roach, this format is an example of interviews that use the online public to defy the typical structure of interviewers and interviewees, comparing it to interviews by Reddit users on r/IAmA.

== Production history ==
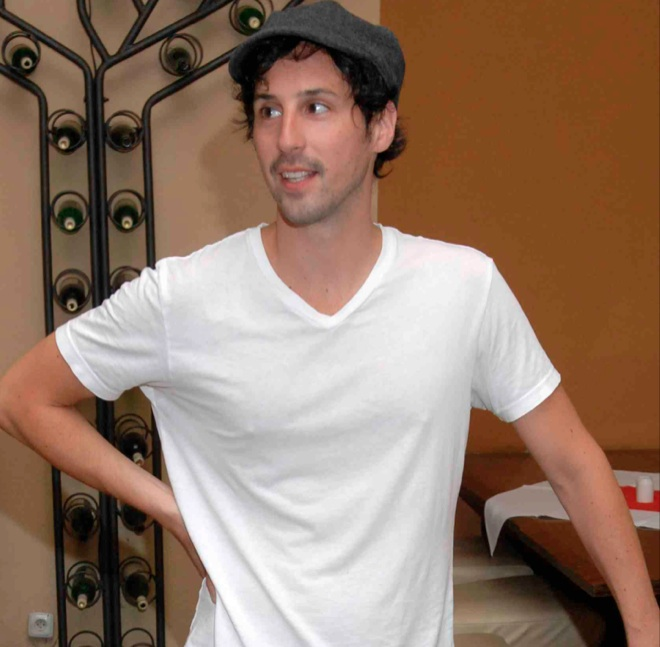
Autocomplete Interview was created under the leadership of Joe Sabia (pictured).

Autocomplete Interview is produced by the American technology magazine Wired. The series began in 2016. It was one of several web series created by Condé Nast, Wired's parent company, under the leadership of senior vice president of creative development Joe Sabia. The tenth episode, in June 2016, featured YouTubers discussing themselves and the website. By October 2017, the series consisted of 30 YouTube videos with a total of over 80 million views. A November 2017 episode featured actors from Stranger Things, Joe Keery and Gaten Matarazzo. The series was a breakout success for Condé Nast in 2017, alongside 73 Questions by Vogue. It was syndicated on other video platforms, including Facebook Watch and Snapchat Discover. Episodes in 2018 included an interview with a group of astronauts and with the whole main cast of that year's film Ant-Man and the Wasp.

Autocomplete Interview became the most popular Wired video series, receiving 400 million views (on all platforms combined) by January 2019. A July 2019 episode again featuring Stranger Things actors—Millie Bobby Brown, Finn Wolfhard, and Noah Schnapp—became the most viewed of the series, as of 2024. Other guests included singer Dolly Parton in 2020 and actors Billy Boyd and Dominic Monaghan in 2021. A June 2023 episode featured the AI program ChatGPT as the guest, using a text-to-speech voice. Autocomplete Interview reached one billion views by 2023. It was one of Condé Nast's most viewed video series that year.

A September 2024 episode featured Vice President Kamala Harris during her presidential campaign. The questions primarily focused on politics. In response to a search term about having the endorsement of Taylor Swift, Harris said that she was "very proud" and joked about herself and Swift being fans of opposing teams in the previous Super Bowl. Alec Regimbal of SFGate wrote that Harris's interview would appeal to younger demographics who are less likely to watch cable news, while Gene Park of The Washington Post described it as one of Harris's appearances in media with largely male audiences. Grace Eliza Goodwin of Business Insider stated that it was an example of the Harris campaign's focus on non-mainstream media.

== Popularity and influence ==
Autocomplete Interview is a popular series, with several episodes receiving millions of views. According to Alec Regimbal of SFGate, it is one of the two most popular online interview series, alongside Hot Ones.

The series's format was imitated by British prime minister Boris Johnson in a January 2020 YouTube video, with questions about himself and his Brexit policy. According to political scholar Daniel Beck, Johnson used the format to present himself as responding to the public, while choosing which questions to include. The format was also imitated by German politician Sahra Wagenknecht in 2025. Saturday Night Live parodied Autocomplete Interview in the premiere of its 49th season (2023), with Pete Davidson playing a fictitious actor who faces an embarrassing question.
