= The Chalkeaters =

Russian comedy-rock band

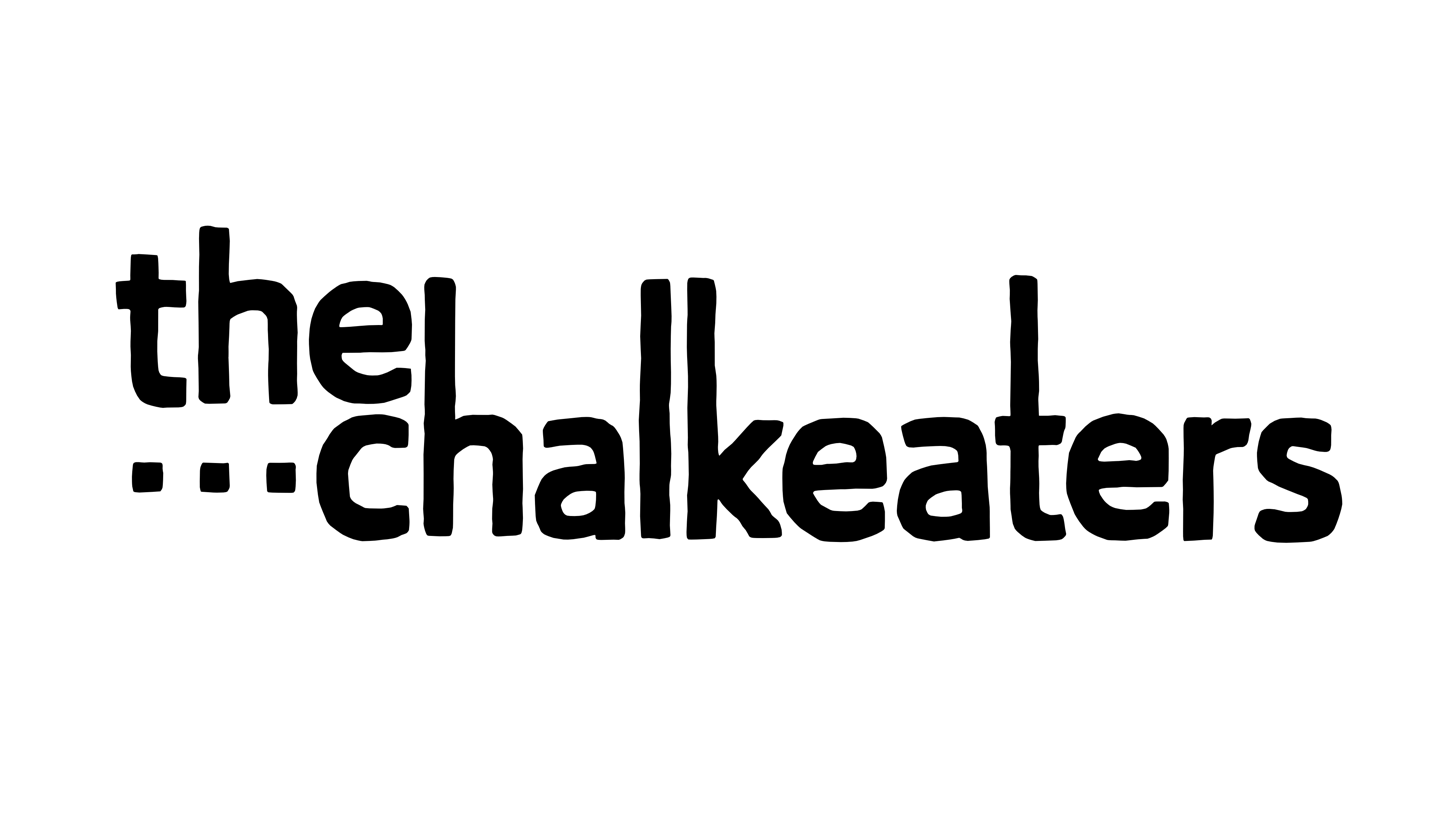

Background information
- Origin: Saint Petersburg, Russia
- Genres: Comedy rock, chip-hop, swing
- Years active: 2019–present
- Label: Independent
- Members: Alexander Serebro; Tim Maslov; Ergy
- Website: thechalkeaters.com

YouTube information
- Channel: TheChalkeaters
- Subscribers: 1.1 million
- Views: 398 million
- Last updated: August 29, 2026

The Chalkeaters is a Russian comedy rock and multimedia project based in Saint Petersburg, Russia. Founded in early 2019 by Alexander Serebro, Tim Maslov and Ergy, the group is primarily known for producing satirical songs and animated music videos based on popular video games and in some cases the gaming industry. Their work often features collaborations with notable voice actors and internet personalities, such as Ellen McLain, The Stupendium, MatPat, and Gabe Newell.

== History ==
The Chalkeaters was formed by Alexander Serebro, Tim Maslov, and Ergy as an alternative multimedia project designed to explore the collision of gaming communities and digital environment through music. The group gained viral internet attraction in 2020 for their song, "Doom Crossing: Eternal Horizons," a track celebrating the coincidental release of Animal Crossing: New Horizons and Doom Eternal, which was praised for capturing the community-driven crossover phenomenon.

In 2021, the band released "Count to Three," a song satirizing Valve Corporation's perceived inability to release a third installment in their major franchises. The track featured a cameo appearance by Valve founder Gabe Newell and vocals by Ellen McLain, the voice of GLaDOS from the Portal series. The project's work is frequently cited for its high-quality animation and commentary on the business practices of gaming companies such as Nintendo and Bethesda Softworks.

== Discography ==
Year	Title	Featured artist(s)	Theme or subject	Note
2019	"It Just Works"	Kyle Wright	Todd Howard and Bethesda	
2019	"Breathtaking"	Natalia Natchan	Cyberpunk 2077	
2020	"Doom Crossing: Eternal Horizons"	Natalia Natchan	Animal Crossing: New Horizons & Doom: Eternal	
2020	"Lock Me Up (Quarantine Song)"	Idrise		
2020	"It's a Gamer's Christmas"	Natalia Natchan		
2021	"Count to Three"	The Stupendium, Ellen McLain, Gabe Newell	Valve Corporation	
2022	"Crushing Thirties"	Johnny Gioeli	Sonic the Hedgehog	
2022	"Rise Guys"	Dennis DeMille	Fall Guys	
2022	"A Songus Amongus"	Black Gryph0n	Among Us	
2022	"Furrýmon: Gotta Smash 'Em All!"	Black Gryph0n, PiNKII	Pokėmon	
2023	"Bowsette"	Meret Giddy, Nekro G	Bowsette	community collaboration video
2023	"Must Have Been the Wind"	Black Gryph0n	Skyrim	
2023	"One More Pull"	Black Gryph0n, Rustage	Genshin Impact	
2024	"Roll out the Fallout!"	Black Gryph0n, Benny Benack III	Fallout	
2024	"FNAF KIDS"	Black Gryph0n, The Stupendium, MatPat	Five Nights at Freddy's	
2024	"Cheeki Breeki"	Lenich & Kirya	S.T.A.L.K.E.R.	
2024	"Shadow Wick: Murderholics"	Caleb Hyles	John Wick / Shadow the Hedgehog	
2025	"Trash Can Song"	Elsie Lovelock, Michael Kovach	Honkai: Star Rail	featured on the HoYoFair program
2025	"Marketable Plush"	Black Gryph0n		
2025	"Ready Player Two"	Chi-Chi, Alex Walker Smith	Sonic the Hedgehog and Super Mario supporting characters	

== See also ==
- The Living Tombstone, a similar American rock duo/band that also produces video game music on YouTube
