= Lauren Riihimaki =

Canadian YouTuber (born 1993)

- Born: Lauren Kobayashi Riihimaki; August 11, 1993 (age 33); St. Catharines, Ontario, Canada
- Education: Toronto Metropolitan University (previously known as Ryerson University)
- Occupations: YouTuber; designer; podcast host
- Years active: 2011–present
- Spouse: Jeremy Lewis (m. 2024)
- Partner: Alex Wassabi (2015-2018)

YouTube information
- Channels: LaurDIY; LaurDIY Vlogs; WILD 'TIL 9
- Genres: DIY, Music, Beauty
- Subscribers: 8.19 million (LaurDIY); 363 thousand (LaurDIY Vlogs); 347 thousand (WILD 'TIL 9)
- Views: 456 million (LaurDIY); 64.9 million (LaurDIY Vlogs); 103 million (WILD 'TIL 9)
- Last updated: May 11, 2025
- Website: laurdiy.com

Lauren Kobayashi Riihimaki (born August 11, 1993) is a Canadian YouTuber known for her video content on the LaurDIY channel as well as her vlog and podcast content on the LaurDIY Vlogs and WILD 'TIL 9 channels. As of January 2022, LaurDIY has over 8.5 million subscribers, and LaurDIY Vlogs and WILD 'TIL 9 have a combined 535,000 subscribers.

== Career ==
Riihimaki began posting DIY tutorial videos on her blog in her first year of university in Toronto. She first joined YouTube on December 1, 2011, originally to post her sewing videos on the platform. In 2015, she graduated from Toronto Metropolitan University (previously Ryerson University) with a degree in graphic communications management. She won a Shorty Award in the "House & Home" category at the tenth annual ceremony. She also won a Streamy Award in the "Lifestyle" category at the Awards' debut ceremony in 2017. In the same year, her web series Served By LaurDIY premiered on Facebook Watch.

In 2017, Riihimaki appeared as The Engineer, in season 2 of the YouTube Premium series, Escape the Night, created by Joey Graceffa.

In 2019, Riihimaki was announced as the host and executive producer for the HBO Max competition series called Craftopia. The show ran for 2 seasons, and was nominated for an Emmy in 2021 for Outstanding Art Direction/Set Decoration/Scenic Design.

In 2025, Riihimaki launched Fuzzboy Originals, a dog lifestyle brand inspired by her mini bull terriers, Moose and Diggy. The company debuted with a collection of functional dog-walking accessories, including treat pouches, waste bags, and walking bags designed with an emphasis on style and everyday utility.

== Personal life ==
Riihimaki is of Finnish and Ukrainian descent through her father, and of Japanese descent through her mother.

Riihimaki dated Sebastian "Baz" Morris from 2010 to 2015, with the pair remaining friends after they split. Morris died in late May 2020 after an accidental drowning. She started dating fellow YouTuber Alexander "Alex" Burriss, also known as Alex Wassabi on YouTube, in 2015. They broke up in 2018.

In 2019, Riihimaki began dating singer and entrepreneur Jeremy Lewis. They met for the first time when she was filming the "Roast Yourself Rap" that was popular in 2015. He worked at the music distribution company, Stem Disintermedia that distributed her work. In December 2022, Riihimaki and Lewis publicized their engagement on social media. On April 7, 2024, Riihimaki married Lewis.
