= Craftopia =

American reality television series

- Genre: Reality competition
- Created by: Rhett Bachner; Brien Meagher
- Presented by: Lauren Riihimaki
- Judges: Toya Moore-Broyles; James Worsham
- Country of origin: United States
- Original language: English
- No. of seasons: 2
- No. of episodes: 20

Production
- Executive producer: Rhett Bachner
- Production company: B17 Entertainment

Original release
- Network: HBO Max
- Release: May 27, 2020 – November 18, 2021

Craftopia is an American reality television series that premiered on HBO Max on May 27, 2020. In October 2020, the series was renewed for a second season. In August 2022, the series was cancelled.

== Premise ==
Craftopia is a youth-oriented crafting competition, with the contestants' ages ranging from 9 to 15. Contestants are given challenges to create different items within a time period. Before each challenge, the contestants race to fill their carts up with materials from the "store", and then work to craft different creations based on the given instructions. The goal is to build what the judges consider the best creation overall in order to bring home the "Craftrophia and $5,000".

== Episodes ==
Season	Episodes	Originally released	
Season	Episodes	First released	Last released
1	12	May 27, 2020	November 26, 2020
2	8	October 7, 2021	November 18, 2021

=== Season 1 (2020) ===
No. overall	No. in season	Title	Original release date
1	1	"It's My Party and I'll Craft If I Want To"	May 27, 2020
2	2	"Petopia"	May 27, 2020
3	3	"If The Shoe Fits, Craft It"	May 27, 2020
4	4	"The Right Stuffed"	May 27, 2020
5	5	"It's Lit"	May 27, 2020
6	6	"New Backpack, Who Dis?"	May 27, 2020
7	7	"Treecycled"	May 27, 2020
8	8	"It's Party Slime"	May 27, 2020
9	9	"Craftenstein's Monster"	October 22, 2020
10	10	"Nightmare on Craft Street"	October 22, 2020
11	11	"Merry Craftmas!"	November 26, 2020
12	12	"Craft the Halls"	November 26, 2020

=== Season 2 (2021) ===
No. overall	No. in season	Title	Original release date
13	1	"Candy Couture"	October 7, 2021
14	2	"Bow-Wow Ween"	October 7, 2021
15	3	"Scary Delicious"	October 7, 2021
16	4	"Pumpkin to Talk About"	October 7, 2021
17	5	"Make It Train"	November 18, 2021
18	6	"Holiday on Wheels"	November 18, 2021
19	7	"Totally Tree-ifying"	November 18, 2021
20	8	"Hat’s That"	November 18, 2021

== Production ==
The show was produced by B17 Entertainment, a subsidiary of Industrial Media, and hosted by Lauren Riihimaki, better known as LaurDIY. The series was first announced in October 2019. In April 2020, it was confirmed that Craftopia would launch alongside the streaming service HBO Max on May 27, 2020.
