= Escape the Night season 1 =

First season of Escape the Night

Escape the Night
- Season 1
- Promotional poster for season one.
- No. of contestants: 11
- Winners: Joey Graceffa; Eva Gutowski; Oli White
- No. of episodes: 10

Release
- Original network: YouTube Red
- Original release: June 22 – August 17, 2016

Season chronology
- Next → Season 2

The first season of Escape the Night premiered on YouTube Red on June 22, 2016, and concluded on August 17, 2016, after 10 episodes. Created and hosted by Joey Graceffa, the season follows Graceffa, playing "The Savant", as he invites ten fellow internet personalities to a dinner party at an estate that "only exists in the year 1920", where each guest assumes a persona from the Roaring Twenties. Trapped in the estate by the evil that controls it, the guests must survive until sunrise by solving puzzles, voting one another into lethal challenges, and uncovering the house's history in order to escape.

The season's storyline was scripted and performed with actors, while the guests' votes and the outcomes of most death challenges were decided in play. Three guests — Graceffa, Eva Gutowski, and Oli White — survived the night and escaped the estate.

== Format ==
Eleven guests, including Graceffa as host and participant, are trapped inside an estate that exists in the year 1920, each dressed and behaving as an era-appropriate persona assigned on their invitation. After the first guest is poisoned at dinner, a letter left by the Society Against Evil establishes the season's objective: four artifacts hidden across the estate must be recovered before sunrise, at the cost of further lives. When the ritual meant to bind the house's evil with the four artifacts fails, a second objective is revealed midway through the season — the house draws its strength from its five former owners, and all five must be freed before the evil can be banished.

Each episode generally opens with a recap narrated by Graceffa and a scripted flashback introducing the episode's threat, often showing a victim of the house's past. The guests then work through a chain of puzzles, séances, and searches tied to that episode's artifact or owner, communicating the rules of each stage through notes found in the house. The chain culminates in a lethal challenge: the guests write their votes on slips that the butler, Arthur, draws from a hat, and the two names drawn enter the challenge. In some episodes, the nominated guests choose partners who compete on their behalf. The loser dies and is eliminated, and the group recovers that episode's artifact or frees that episode's owner.

The structure varies across the season. In the premiere, the entire group competes to save the poisoned guest. In the third episode, a single name is drawn and that guest is buried alive, with no intervening challenge. In the fourth, the challenge ends with a murder journal in which the competitors must write the name of another guest. In the fifth, both nominated guests are spared. In the ninth, every guest places their own name in the hat, and the two drawn choose partners of the opposite gender. The finale replaces the vote with an escape sequence in which the surviving guests evade the estate's staff while completing a final puzzle chain before 6:00 a.m.

Graceffa has said that three of the season's eliminations were arranged in advance by production: Shane Dawson's, because he was available for only one night, with the premiere's riddle designed so that it could not be solved in the time allotted, and those of GloZell Green and Justine Ezarik.

== Production ==
In October 2015, the subscription service then known as YouTube Red revealed upcoming projects such as Fight of the Living Dead, A Trip to Unicorn Island (2016), Single by 30, and Scare PewDiePie. These included an untitled Joey Graceffa project involving a murder mystery. In May 2016, the service teased clips of the upcoming series. Sam Gutelle, a writer for Tubefilter, described the premise as "the board game Clue", turning the party "into a whodunit, with each guest transformed into a suspect." Graceffa told Teen Vogue that the idea for the project had been in the works for two years, and that he most looked forward to collaborating with other YouTubers.

The season was filmed over five consecutive nights in the Los Angeles area, with shoots running from 10 p.m. to 6 a.m. and two episodes filmed each night. Writer and director Adam Lawson chose the house, built in 1890 and located near the base of a mountain, before writing the season, so that its puzzles could be designed around the location. Its roughly 160 clues and puzzles were developed with designers from Enigma Escape Room and built by production designer Geoff Flint's team, and had to work on the first attempt, as the live portion of each episode was filmed without retakes. Graceffa co-developed the storyline but was not told its clues, twists, or the timing of his own eliminations, so that he could play alongside the cast.

== Guests ==
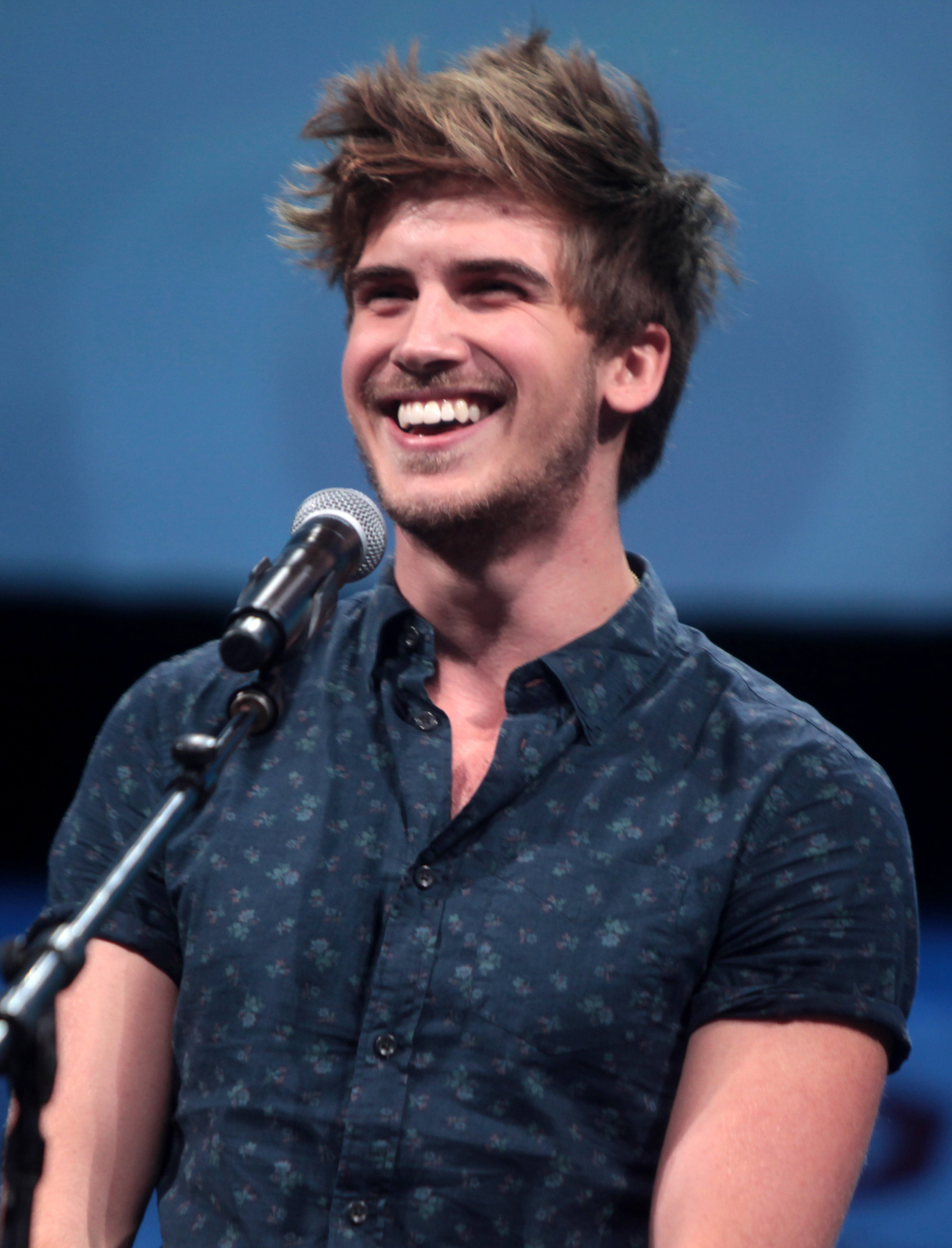
Joey Graceffa

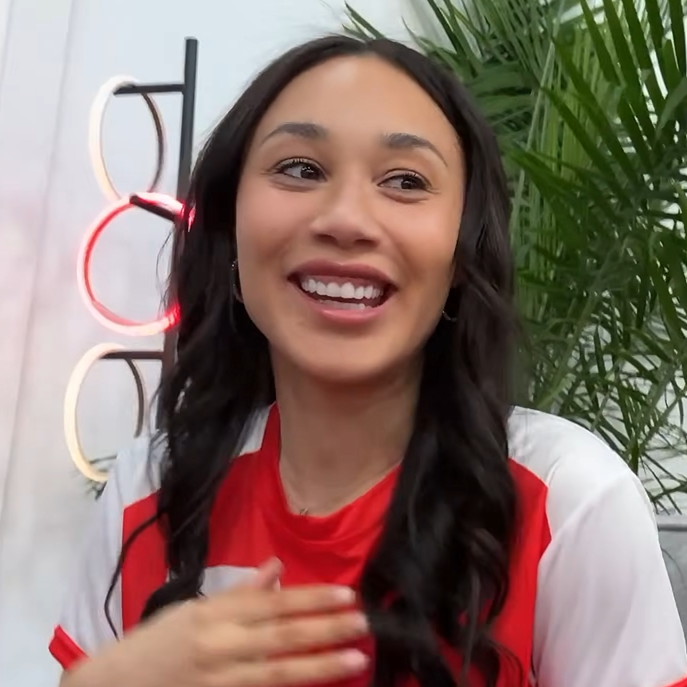
Eva Gutowski

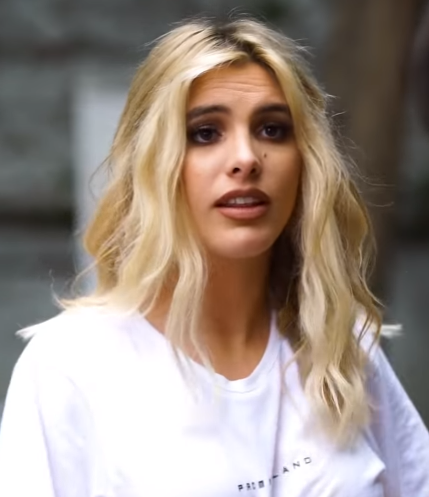
Lele Pons

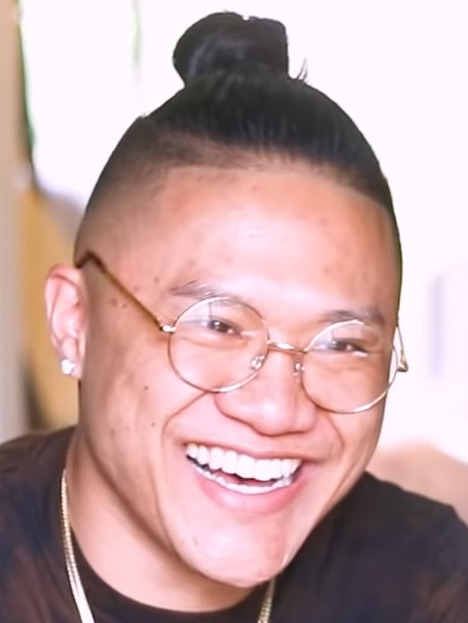
Timothy DeLaGhetto

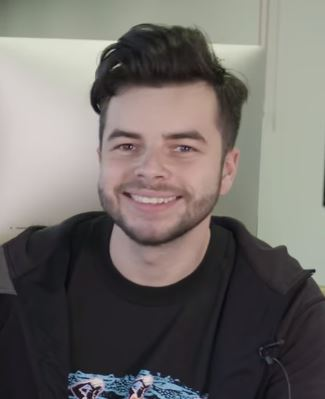
Matt Haag

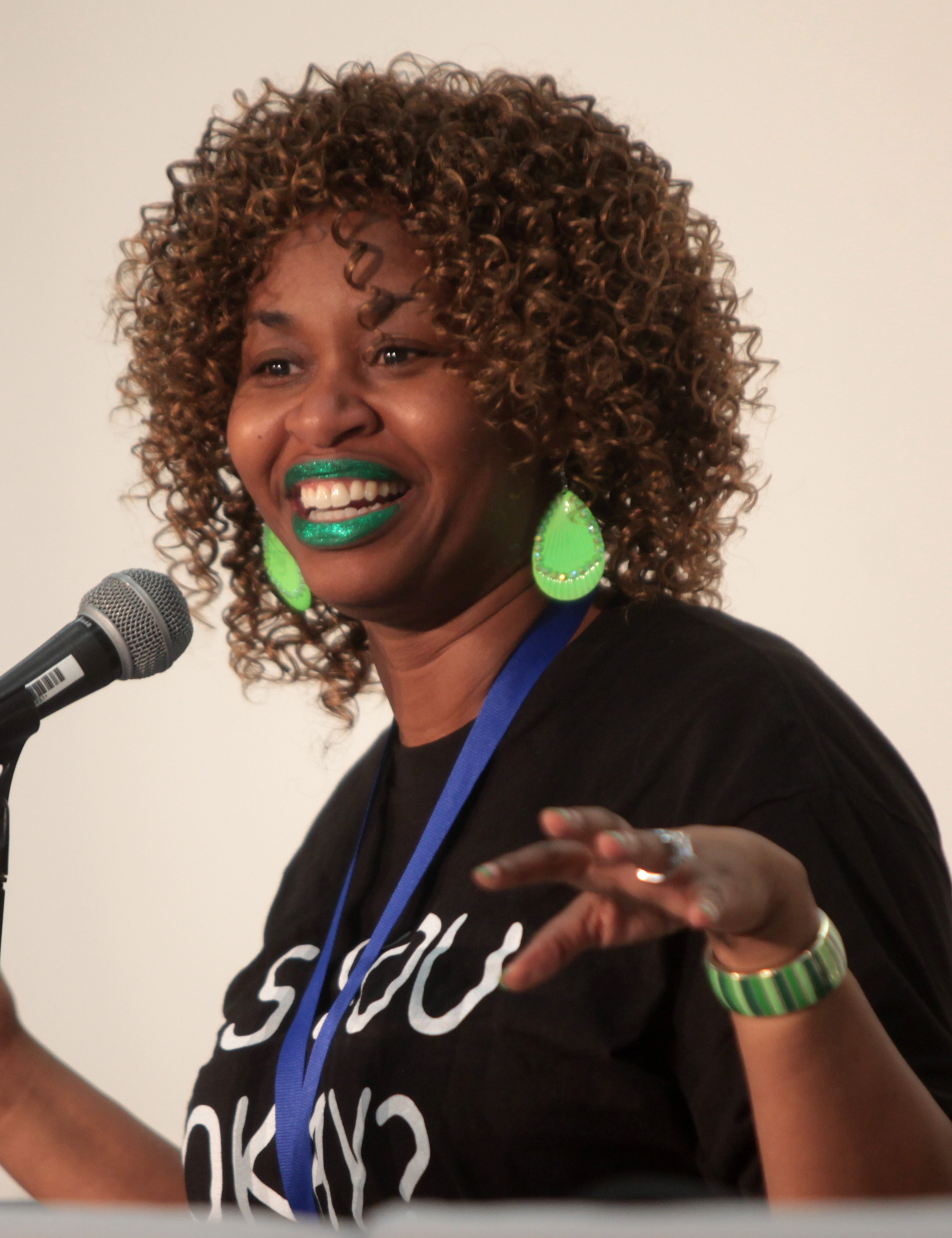
GloZell Green

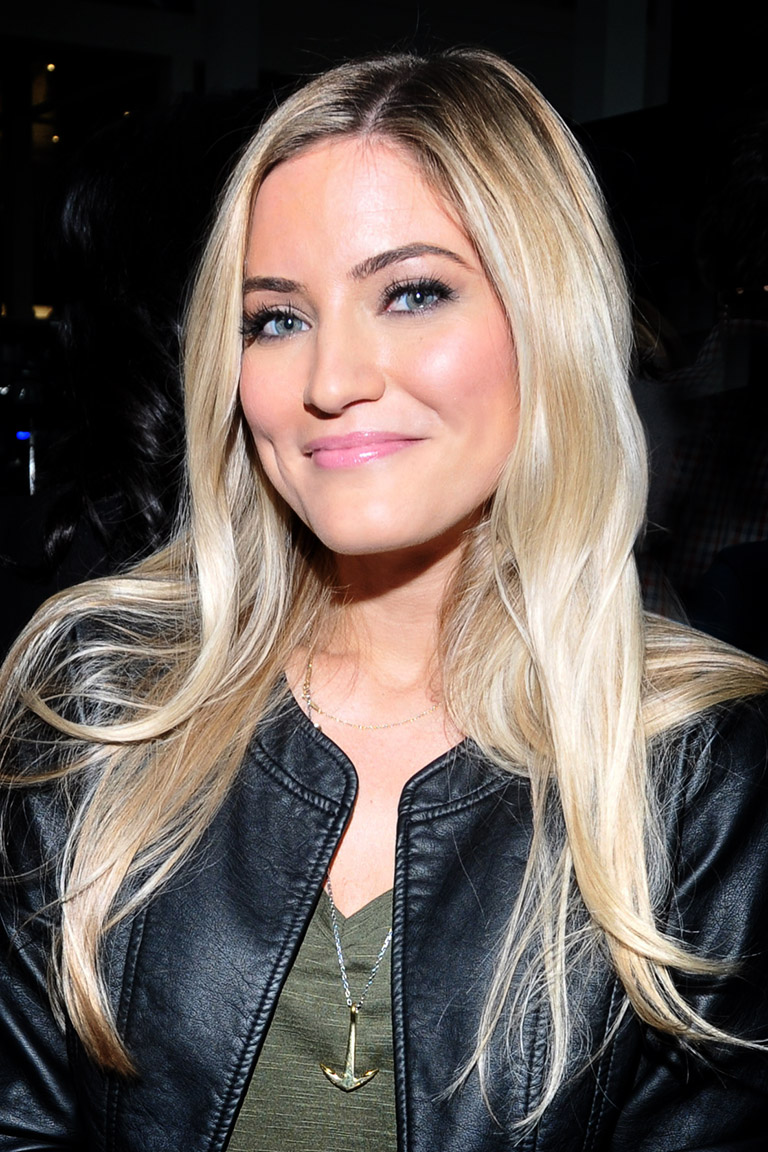
Justine Ezarik

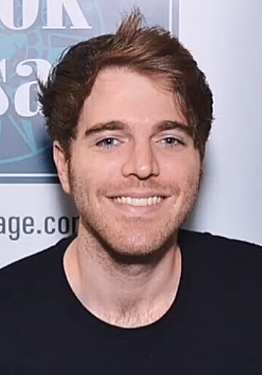
Shane Dawson

Guests from the first season of Escape the Night
Guest	Persona	Status	Cause of Death
Joey Graceffa	The Savant	Escaped (Episode 10)	—N/a
Eva Gutowski	The Journalist	Escaped (Episode 10)	—N/a
Oli White	The Big Game Hunter	Escaped (Episode 10)	—N/a
Lele Pons	The Hustler	Dead (Episode 9)	Electrocuted by the learning chair
Timothy DeLaGhetto	The Mobster	Dead (Episode 8)	Shot himself playing Russian roulette
Matt Haag	The Professor	Dead (Episode 7)	Ingested poison twice
Sierra Furtado	The Heiress	Dead (Episode 6)	Demonically possessed and convulsed to death
GloZell Green	The Jazz Singer	Dead (Episode 4) (Note: Graceffa has said this elimination was arranged in advance by production.)	Choked on her own blood after her name was written in the murder journal
Justine Ezarik	The Gambler	Dead (Episode 3)	Buried alive to reverse the Claws Ritual
Andrea Brooks	The Fixer	Dead (Episode 2)	Asphyxiated by gas from the Ungodly Machine
Shane Dawson	The Renegade	Dead (Episode 1) (Note: Graceffa has said this death was planned in advance because Dawson was available for only one night.)	Poisoned by the evil of the house

== Cast ==
The estate's staff and inhabitants, along with the antagonists of each episode, were played by actors.

=== Recurring ===
Character	Played by	Role	Outcome
Arthur	Paul Chirico	The estate's butler, who guides the guests through the night and draws the names for each vote	Revealed in Episode 9 as the one in league with the evil of the house; killed by his brother in Episode 10
Sarah	Katia Hayes	The maid	Killed by the butler's brother in Episode 10
Marvin	David Hutchison	The groundskeeper	Killed by the butler's brother in Episode 10

=== The former owners ===
Within the season's story, the house draws its strength from its five former owners, each of whom must be freed by the guests.

Owner	Played by	Introduced	Freed	Notes
David Santos	Danny Pardo	Episode 6	Episode 6	A priest who lost his faith after a failed exorcism; freed when the guests complete it
Madison Jones	Anastasia Zorin	Episode 7	Episode 7	Transformed into a mermaid; freed when the guests return her daughter's doll
Colin Wentworth	Zach Cramblit	Episode 8	Episode 8	A soldier obsessed with his lost gold; freed when the guests recover it
Vincent Wells	David Rispoli	Episode 9	Episode 9	A sanatorium patient tormented by hallucinations; freed when the guests survive three of them
The Butler's Brother	Kevin Foster	Episode 10	Episode 10	Imprisoned in the cellar by Arthur; upon release, kills Sarah, Marvin, and Arthur

=== Minor characters ===
- Lindsay Roetzel as Bellhop Girl, who delivers the invitations to the guests (episode 1)
- Chris Nielsen as the Rolls-Royce Driver, who drives the guests to the estate and is killed when the car explodes (episode 1)
- Scott Thewes as Dennis Mann, who brings the Ungodly Creature to life (episode 2)
- Romika Annabell Osorio as the Ungodly Creature, which emerges from the Ungodly Machine (episode 2)
- Michael Zazarino and Angelique Pereira as the Ungodly Machine's test subjects (episode 2)
- Zac Titus as Michael and Jay Washington as the Nervous Man, who helped conceal the second artifact (episode 3)
- Maddy Curley as Caroline Eastwick, who was buried alive to conceal the second artifact (episode 3)
- Andrew Stroud as Calvin, a serial killer who murdered his family and preserved them as mannequins (episode 4)
- Omar Deckard as Sam, the estate's guardian (episode 5)
- Kelcey Watson as the Ring Leader and Daniel Preda as Claudia the Ticket Master, of the carnival (episode 5)
- Mark McClain Wilson as Frederick, Madison's abusive husband, and Sofia Naccarato as Verona, her daughter (episode 7)

== Guest history ==
=== Voting history ===
Legend:

Escaped the first season of Escape the Night.
Guest was voted into a challenge and won.
Guest was selected as a partner for a challenge competitor and won, saving their partner.
Guest was selected as a partner for a challenge competitor and lost, causing their partner to die.
Guests were to complete tasks to save a poisoned guest, but failed to save them.
Guest was voted into a challenge and remained safe.
Guest was declared safe from the challenge.
Guest wasn't voted into a challenge but died.
Guest was not voted into a challenge but instead voted to die.
Guest wasn't voted into the challenge and was chosen to die by the guests voted in the challenge.
Guest was voted into a challenge and died.

Escape The Night season 1 voting history
	1	2	3	4	5	6	7	8	9	10
Voted Players	(None)	Andrea; Lele	(None)	Joey; Lele	Oli; Timothy	Matt; Sierra	Matt; Timothy	Eva; Timothy	Lele; Oli	(None)
Challenge Winner(s)	(None)	Lele	(None)	Joey; Lele	Oli; Timothy	Matt	Timothy	Eva	Oli	(None)
Eliminated	Shane	Andrea	Justine	Glozell	(None)	Sierra	Matt	Timothy	Lele	(None)
Joey	Safe	Andrea	Timothy	Himself	Oli	Sierra	Timothy	Timothy	Joey	Escaped
Eva	Safe	Andrea	Justine	Joey	Timothy	Sierra	Matt	Joey	Eva	Escaped
Oli	Safe	Safe	Justine	Matt	Joey	Matt	Matt	Joey	Oli	Escaped
Lele	Safe	Matt	Justine	Matt	Matt	Matt	Matt	Eva	Lele	
Timothy	Safe	Lele	Justine	Sierra	Sierra	Sierra	Eva	Eva		
Matt	Safe	Lele	Lele	Lele	Oli	Sierra	Eva			
Sierra	Safe	Andrea	Justine	Matt	Timothy	Matt				
Glozell	Safe	Eva	Justine	Joey						
Justine	Safe	Andrea	Timothy							
Andrea	Safe	Joey								
Shane	Dead									

=== Challenge history ===
Legend:

The guest was eliminated but was never voted for a challenge.
The guest was eliminated after their first time being voted for a challenge.
The guest was eliminated after their second time being voted for a challenge.
The guest was eliminated after their third time being voted for a challenge.

Episode	Guest(s)			Challenge	Eliminated	Cause of Death
1	Everyone			In three groups, the guests had fifteen minutes to solve three puzzles, each unlocking one bottle of a divided antidote for Shane Dawson, who had been poisoned at dinner.	Shane Dawson	Poisoned by the evil of the house.
2	Andrea Brooks	vs.	Lele Pons	While the nominees were sealed in gas capsules, their chosen partners raced through three sabotage puzzles to force the Ungodly Machine to malfunction; the first to finish freed their player, and the other capsule filled with gas.	Andrea Brooks	Inhaled noxious gas produced by the Ungodly Machine.
3	Everyone			The guests voted, and the single name drawn from the hat was buried alive by the group to reverse the ritual concealing the second artifact.	Justine Ezarik	Buried alive to reverse the Claws Ritual.
4	Joey Graceffa	vs.	Lele Pons	The nominees played party games with Calvin's mannequins to earn the combination to a drawer, which held a murder journal: the next name written in it would die.	GloZell Green	Choked on her own blood after Joey wrote her name in the murder journal.
5	Oli White	vs.	Timothy DeLaGhetto	The two performed in three carnival acts — a strongman bell, juggling, and a tightrope walk — before the crowd voted on which of them should die in a tank said to contain piranhas.	None	The Ring Leader spared their lives.
6	Matt Haag	vs.	Sierra Furtado	Sierra held down a possessed girl while reciting a prayer, as Matt performed the steps of an exorcism around them. The final instruction revealed that the rosary would kill whoever wore it, and that Matt could place it on Sierra or on himself.	Sierra Furtado	Demonically possessed and convulsed to death.
7	Matt Haag	vs.	Timothy DeLaGhetto	After drinking poison, the two recreated three nursery rhymes with dolls in their dollhouses, each earning a vial said to hold the antidote.	Matt Haag	Ingested poison twice.
8	Eva Gutowski	vs.	Timothy DeLaGhetto	A game combining Battleship with Russian roulette, in which every successful strike forced the player hit to fire a revolver at their own head.	Timothy DeLaGhetto	Shot himself in the head while playing Russian roulette.
9	Lele Pons	vs.	Oli White	Strapped into electroshock "learning chairs", the nominees depended on partners of the opposite gender throwing metal rings onto posts; every miss delivered a shock, and the slower team's chair overloaded.	Lele Pons	Electrocuted by the learning chair.

== Episodes ==
No. overall	No. in season	Title	Directed by	Written by	Original release date
1	1	"An Invitation"	Adam Lawson	Adam Lawson	June 22, 2016
Haunted by dreams of a house "built without hands", Joey receives a letter informing him that he has inherited an estate through the death of a distant relative he never met, and finds himself compelled to invite others to it. He sends ten friends invitations to a dinner party, each assigning a persona from the 1920s; only guests dressed in character can reach the estate, which "only exists in the year 1920". During the party, Eva and Shane slip away and witness the maid dragging a body upstairs. At dinner, Shane collapses, poisoned by the evil of the house. Group Challenge: The guests have fifteen minutes to solve three puzzles and unlock the three bottles containing the divided antidote. Only one group succeeds — Joey, Eva, and GloZell, who find a key hidden inside a painting — and Shane dies with the antidote incomplete. Eliminated: Shane Dawson (The Renegade) — died of poison. Revelation: A letter hidden on Shane's body reveals that a dark force controls the house, that the Society Against Evil has marked clues around the estate with its symbol, and that four artifacts must be recovered before sunrise if the guests hope to return to 2016 — at the cost of more lives. Notes: The guests attempt to flee, but their car explodes with the driver inside, sealing them within the estate. There is no vote in this episode; the season's voting mechanism is introduced in the following episode.
2	2	"The Ungodly Machine"	Adam Lawson	Adam Lawson	June 22, 2016
A flashback shows the machine in the basement being charged by the deaths of two abducted test subjects. In the present, the guests must locate the first artifact. Investigation: A spirit-board séance spells out "books", leading to eight volumes hidden across the first floor; the books yield a code opening a severed hand, which leads to a chess-arrangement puzzle and then to the ballroom, where elemental symbols produce the combination (2358) to a cabinet revealing that the Ungodly Machine below must be driven to malfunction. Voted into the challenge: Andrea and Lele, drawn from a hat by Arthur.: Andrea's chosen partner: Justine; Lele's chosen partner: Eva; Death Challenge: The nominees are sealed in gas capsules wired to the machine while their partners race through three sabotage puzzles — decoding a lever blueprint, retrieving a screw from iced water, and rewiring a control panel. The first partner to force a malfunction frees their player; the loser's capsule floods with gas. Challenge Winner: Eva, freeing Lele. Eliminated: Andrea Brooks (The Fixer) — asphyxiated by the machine's gas. Artifact: The first artifact is recovered. Notes: Justine's suggestion that Andrea's death may have been for the best turns the group against her, with several accusing her of deliberately sabotaging the challenge. Oli finds a note warning that one among the group is in league with the evil of the house; suspicion initially falls on Joey.
3	3	"Buried Alive"	Adam Lawson	Adam Lawson	June 29, 2016
A flashback shows a young woman seized and buried alive on the estate grounds. In the present, the traitor's note has the guests openly accusing one another. Investigation: To contact the buried woman, Caroline Eastwick, the guests must gather three of her possessions to protect the séance — her scarf, hidden in a tissue box in the guest room; her emerald earrings, in the back of a jewelry box; and a lock of her hair, a blonde wig in a hidden bathroom. The séance succeeds: Caroline directs them to her coffin near a red stone, its key reached by "the low road". The coffin proves empty except for a note: Caroline was buried alive to conceal the second artifact, and another person must be buried alive to reverse the ritual. Vote: The group must vote, but "only one name will be drawn this time", and that guest will be buried alive; there is no challenge. Justine is drawn. She attempts to flee but is caught by Marvin, the groundskeeper, and the group buries her themselves. Eliminated: Justine Ezarik (The Gambler) — buried alive to reverse the Claws Ritual. Artifact: The second artifact is unearthed from the reopened grave, alongside a sealed wooden box of unknown purpose. Notes: This is the only episode of the season in which the vote itself is the elimination mechanism, with no intervening challenge.
4	4	"Mannequins"	Adam Lawson	Adam Lawson	July 6, 2016
A flashback introduces Calvin, a serial killer who murdered his family and preserved them as mannequins. In the present, GloZell accuses Joey of feigning grief over Justine and insists that, as the owner of the house, he must know what its servants are doing; Joey protests that the estate is not yet his. Investigation: Smashing the mystery box yields a slip reading "IDLE"; converted to alphabet positions (9-4-12-5) and set on a four-handed clock, it exposes a library keyhole and a photograph of the foyer staircase, where the key is hidden behind loose wood. The key opens a hidden room of mannequins — Calvin's murdered family, one figure short. Meanwhile, Tim and Sierra slip away to a car outside, recovering a "slow down" note, a key by the brake, and the missing fifth mannequin from the trunk, completing the dinner scene. Voted into the challenge: Joey and Lele, sent upstairs to play "perverse games" for the third artifact. Death Challenge: A series of party games with the mannequins yields a combination opening a drawer containing a murder journal: the next name written in it will die. Lele argues for Matt; Joey writes GloZell's name. Eliminated: GloZell Green (The Jazz Singer) — coughed up blood and died after her name was written in the murder journal. Joey and Lele both survive the challenge. Artifact: The third artifact is recovered. Notes: Joey urges Lele to conceal their role in GloZell's death; when Matt erupts, Lele admits the truth, telling him it was a choice between him and GloZell. The episode ends with an inhuman roar as Arthur announces that the house has released its guardian.
5	5	"Freak Show"	Adam Lawson	Adam Lawson	July 13, 2016
With the guardian stalking the grounds, Joey returns from his encounter with it holding a circus ticket. Investigation: The guests trace an orange scent to a ticket box dispensing two clown masks that render their wearers invisible to the guardian, and search the grounds in rotating pairs. A key in a birdbath opens the pool house, where a mirror-code puzzle inside nested chests produces a music box; its melody summons a ringmaster who leashes the guardian and opens a carnival containing the final artifact. Voted into the challenge: Oli and Timothy. Death Challenge: The two perform before a carnival crowd in three events — a strongman bell, won by Oli; juggling, failed by both; and a tightrope walk, won by Tim — after which the audience votes on who dies. Both are locked into a dunk tank said to contain piranhas, and both are dunked. Eliminated: None — the tank proves harmless, and the Ring Leader spares both lives. This is the season's only episode without an elimination. Artifact: The fourth and final artifact is recovered. Notes: With all four artifacts assembled, the guests prepare the ritual they believe will banish the evil.
6	6	"Did Someone Call For An Exorcist?"	Adam Lawson	Adam Lawson	July 20, 2016
A flashback shows a priest failing an exorcism and losing his faith. In the present, the binding ritual — Sierra wrapping the center artifact in black coil while Matt reads the invocation — fails as the artifacts topple. Investigation: A hidden black box leads Joey and Tim to David Santos, the priest, imprisoned in the back basement. He reveals the season's true objective: the house draws its strength from its five former owners, all of whom must be freed before the demon can be banished. His own freedom requires completing the exorcism he abandoned. Split into teams, the guests recover a rosary from a cabinet keyed to Revelation 13:1 by arranging seven demon names alphabetically, and prepare holy water by solving a Roman-numeral equation hidden in a painting of Saint Peter. Voted into the challenge: Matt and Sierra. Matt volunteers, citing his knowledge of exorcisms, then withdraws just before the vote — angering the group, several of whom vote for him anyway. Death Challenge: Sierra must restrain the possessed girl while praying without pause; Matt performs the ritual's steps around them. The concealed final instruction reveals that the rosary kills whoever wears it — Matt may place it on Sierra or on himself. Eliminated: Sierra Furtado (The Heiress) — demonically possessed and convulsed to death after Matt, rushing through the instructions, placed the rosary on her. Owner Freed: David Santos, the priest (first of five). Notes: The group is horrified to learn that Matt could have sacrificed himself instead. "We killed off all of our friends just to get the four artifacts," one guest reflects, "and then we find out we need to do more."
7	7	"Mermaid Tails"	Adam Lawson	Adam Lawson	July 27, 2016
The priest's notebook identifies the next owner as Madison, a woman transformed into a mermaid after her abusive marriage, found chained in an upstairs room. She will be freed only when the guests return her daughter's doll. Investigation: The key to Madison's room is found inside a small golden globe. Her instructions require weighing her victims' names in coins, the total weight forming a safe's combination; luring her mermaid sisters from the pool with a recorded song and trapping them in the pool house; retrieving her three victims' bodies and a chest from the water; and solving a code counted from moon phases on turtle statues around the pool. The safe's final compartment holds a stone tablet ordering two guests into the doll room on the third floor. Voted into the challenge: Matt and Timothy — with resentment still burning over the exorcism, and Matt having declared that he has given up on escaping. Death Challenge: Both drink poison, then must recreate three nursery rhymes using dolls in their dollhouses; mistakes bring more poison, success supposedly an antidote. Both finish and each receives a vial. Eliminated: Matt Haag (The Professor) — declaring himself certain he had won, he drank his vial, which was poison. A note reveals that neither vial was the antidote, which was fastened behind the drawer. Owner Freed: Madison (second of five), released when Tim returns with the doll. Notes: The episode closes with the remaining five guests asking who must be freed next.
8	8	"All Out War"	Adam Lawson	Adam Lawson	August 3, 2016
The next owner is Collin, a soldier consumed by obsession with his lost gold. Presented with a gold bar, he agrees to help the guests — and warns them they are standing in a war zone. Investigation: Under Collin's covering fire, the guests advance into the backyard battlefield guided by radio instructions. Eva destroys an enemy-held building with a grenade, and the group recovers a locked briefcase whose code yields the key to Collin's chest of gold. Joey and Oli complete a task sealed inside a bunker while the others take up rifles to hold off attacking soldiers. Voted into the challenge: Eva and Timothy. Death Challenge: A game combining Battleship with Russian roulette — each player arranges troops on a hidden grid, and every successful strike forces the player hit to fire a revolver at their own head. Eliminated: Timothy DeLaGhetto (The Mobster) — after Eva survived one forced pull, Tim declared he would rather die himself than watch her fire again; on the next strike against him, he pulled the trigger and the chamber fired. Owner Freed: Collin Wentworth (third of five). Eva demands to know whether the gold was worth it; "Yes," he answers before vanishing. Notes: Before the vote, Oli warns Eva that Joey plans to vote her in, and the two form an alliance against him — the first explicit alliance of the season.
9	9	"Wicked Hallucinations"	Adam Lawson	Adam Lawson	August 10, 2016
A flashback opens in a sanatorium, where a doctor administers electric shocks to his patient Vincent as "learning" whenever he describes his visions — until Vincent slips his restraints, kills the doctor, and returns to the manor. The guests find him straitjacketed in the attic: the fourth owner. To free him, they must survive three of his hallucinations, mapped across the grounds. Investigation (Hallucinations 1 and 2): In the greenhouse, the guests assemble a "plant man" from buried body parts while a creature claws at them through the walls; the completed monster destroys their attacker, yielding the first key. At a circle of standing stones, a masked swordswoman presides over hanging masks, five of which match riddles — each wrong choice ejects a guest from the vision. Oli is cast out mid-trial; the final mask proves to be the swordswoman's own, and unmasking her faceless visage costs Lele her place before the group flees with the second key. Voted into the challenge: Lele and Oli. A note orders two guests "selected by vote to sit in the chairs of a mad man", each to choose a partner of the opposite gender. Unwilling to target one another, the guests each place their own name in the hat and "let the house vote".: Lele's partner: Joey; Oli's partner: Eva; Death Challenge: In the doctor's electroshock chamber, the nominees are strapped into "learning" chairs while their partners toss metal rings at posts. Every miss delivers a shock, and the slower team's chair overloads at the time limit. Challenge Winners: Eva and Oli. Eliminated: Lele Pons (The Hustler) — electrocuted when her chair overloaded, after pleading with Joey that he was not trying. Owner Freed: Vincent (fourth of five). Notes: Freed, Vincent unmasks the traitor foretold in the second episode: Arthur, the head of the estate's staff, is the one in league with the evil of the house. The final three flee for their lives as the episode ends.
10	10	"Betrayal At The House On The Hill"	Adam Lawson	Adam Lawson	August 17, 2016
A flashback narrated by Arthur reveals his past as a confidence man who poisoned his wealthy wife on their anniversary before being summoned to the estate, intent on controlling the evil within it. His staff capture Joey, Eva, and Oli, and Arthur reveals that the entire night has served his scheme: he needed the artifacts gathered and the previous owner gone so that Joey would hold the house, and the earlier binding ritual was deliberately false. The three are chloroformed and chained in a hidden torture room. Escape: Passing a poker between them to open their locks, the guests find Arthur's pocket watch and a note: they must leave the estate by sunrise at 6:00 a.m., or the serum they have been injected with will make them permanent servants of the house. Escaping through the butler's chambers with the true ritual diagram, they trigger an alarm; Arthur, Sarah, and Marvin fan out to hunt them, with capture meaning death. Final Investigation: Evading the patrols, the guests recover diamonds from the front fountain, which yield rubies; the rubies fit the eyes of a second-floor gargoyle, releasing an emerald; and a "spiral of pain" staircase leads to the key to a cell in the wine cellar holding the final owner. Owner Freed: The butler's brother (fifth of five), imprisoned by Arthur years before. Released, he takes his revenge — killing Sarah, then Marvin, and finally Arthur himself — before driving the guests inside to finish the ritual. Endgame: Eva and Oli gather the artifacts while Joey takes the deed to the estate, later explaining that he "needed to take it so it wouldn't fall into the wrong hands". The three complete the true ritual, banishing the evil, then bury the artifacts within the allotted five minutes and leave the estate at dawn. Eliminated: None. Escaped: Joey Graceffa, Eva Gutowski, and Oli White. Notes: As Joey stands outside the gates, a dark, crack-like mark briefly spreads across his face before fading. The closing narration reveals that the evil "had found a way into the cracks in his soul", where it "festered and grew" until "an even greater evil" called it — taking Joey "through time, to another era".

== Reception ==
=== Critical response ===
On review aggregator site Rotten Tomatoes, Escape the Night season 1 has a Tomatometer of 71%, based on one critic review. Andy Dehnart of Reality Blurred described the show as "lighthearted" and "campy", writing that while it was still finding its footing, it showed promise and could be seen as a worthy successor to Whodunnit?.

On Common Sense Media, critic Emily Ashby gave a more mixed evaluation. She called the series a "mediocre pseudo-reality horror" that leans heavily on YouTube personalities, and argued that while the ensemble cast and 1920s mansion setup provide some suspense, the plot feels formulaic and overacted. She also noted that the violence is fairly mild, if cinematic, and that there is "very little" in the way of positive role models, though some teamwork and intrigue emerge as strengths.

== Awards and nominations ==
Award	Year	Category	Recipient(s) and nominee(s)	Result	Ref.
Streamy Awards	2016	Best Costume Design	Olivia Hines	Nominated	
Streamy Awards	2016	Best Ensemble Cast	Escape the Night	Won	

== See also ==
- Murder in Small Town X
- The Murder Game
- Whodunnit?
- The Quest
- 13: Fear Is Real
- Killer Camp
