= Me and My Grandma =

- Title screen from the first episode
- Genre: Comedy
- Created by: Eva Gutowski; Annie Stamell
- Starring: Eva Gutowski; Shelby Rabara; Kayla Ewell; Steven Cox; Kelly Sry; Rhea Perlman
- Composer: Al Sgro
- Countries of origin: United States, Australia
- Original language: English
- No. of seasons: 1
- No. of episodes: 6

Production
- Executive producers: Eva Gutowski; Adam Wescott; Scott Fisher; Jill Condon; Annie Stamell
- Producer: Sam Childs
- Cinematography: Harold Skinner
- Editor: Jeremy Pevar
- Camera setup: Single-camera
- Running time: 22–24 minutes
- Production companies: SelectNext, Flying Bark Productions

Original release
- Network: YouTube Red, ABC
- Release: March 22, 2017

Me and My Grandma is a comedy series created by Eva Gutowski and Annie Stamell that premiered on March 22, 2017 on YouTube Red and Flying Bark Productions. The series stars Gutowski and Rhea Perlman and is executive produced by Stamell, Gutowski, Adam Wescott, Scott Fisher, and Jill Condon.

== Premise ==
College graduate Janey and her grandmother move to Hollywood together and attempt to forge acting careers.

== Cast and characters ==
=== Main ===
- Eva Gutowski as Janey Skalecki
- Shelby Rabara as Heidi
- Kayla Ewell as Victoria
- Kelly Sry as Hank
- Steven Cox as Oliver
- Rhea Perlman as Grandma Skalecki

=== Recurring ===
- Lamont Thompson as Desmond
- Tara Moncure as Samantha
- David Gautreaux as George
- Sheila Carrasco as Agent

=== Guest ===
- Staci Greenwell as Barbra Skalecki ("Palm Tree Montage"), Janey's mother.
- Gigi Gorgeous as herself ("Elderboo")
- Joey Graceffa as Teen Boy ("Elderboo")
- Shevyn Roberts as Elizabeth ("Elderboo")

== Episodes ==
| No. | Title | Directed by | Written by | Original release date |
|---|---|---|---|---|
| 1 | "Palm Tree Montage" | Luke Matheny | Annie Stamell | March 22, 2017 |
| 2 | "Elderboo" | Luke Matheny | Cynthia Adarkwa & Liz Rivera | March 22, 2017 |
| 3 | "The Stupid and Boring Store" | Luke Matheny | Annie Stamell | March 22, 2017 |
| 4 | "Eggplant Emoji Dance" | Luke Matheny | Grant Levy & Dominik Rothbard | March 22, 2017 |
| 5 | "Barfelona" | Luke Matheny | Annie Stamell & April K. Quioh | March 22, 2017 |
| 6 | "Go Frappe Yourself" | Luke Matheny | Grant Levy & Dominik Rothbard | March 22, 2017 |

== Production ==
=== Development ===
On August 5, 2016, it was announced that YouTube had given the production a series order for a first season set to premiere in 2017 on YouTube Red. The series was created by Annie Stamell and YouTube celebrity Eva Gutowski both of whom were expected to executive produce alongside Jill Condon, Adam Wescott, and Scott Fisher with Condon also serving as the series' showrunner.

=== Casting ===
Alongside the initial series announcement, it was confirmed that the series would star Eva Gutowski. On November 1, 2016, it was announced that Rhea Perlman had been cast in the role of the titular Grandma.
