= Escape the Night season 2 =

Second season of Escape the Night

Escape the Night
- Season 2
- Promotional poster for season two.
- No. of contestants: 10
- Winners: Andrea Russett; Tyler Oakley
- No. of episodes: 10

Release
- Original network: YouTube Red
- Original release: June 22 – August 16, 2017

Season chronology
- ← Previous; Season 1 Next → Season 3

The second season of Escape the Night premiered on June 22, 2017, through YouTube Red, and concluded on August 16, 2017, after 10 episodes. The season follows Joey Graceffa, again playing "The Savant", and nine fellow internet personalities who are drawn across time to a masquerade ball at a Victorian estate, where each guest assumes an era-appropriate persona. Trapped by an evil Sorceress, the guests must recover eight gems held by her lieutenants in order to rebuild the Crown of Oblivion, the only means of defeating her.

Two guests — Andrea Russett and Tyler Oakley — survived the season and escaped, while Graceffa was killed in the finale, setting up the events of the third season.

== Format ==
The season opens after the first season's ending, in which the evil of the house survived within Joey. Joey has been missing for a few days, not answering his friends' calls or messages, when nine of them receive invitations in his name to a masquerade ball. Guests who dress as the Victorian persona assigned to them can see the carriage that carries them across time to an estate ruled by the Sorceress, who traps them there. After the guests kill the king of vampires, a gem map reveals the season's objective: eight gems, each held by one of the Sorceress's lieutenants, must be recovered to rebuild the Crown of Oblivion, which alone can destroy her. The guests have until morning, when the Sorceress's spell will be complete.

Each episode centers on one lieutenant and the gem they guard. After a recap and a scripted flashback introducing the lieutenant, the guests work through that antagonist's puzzles and demands, then typically vote two of their own into a lethal challenge, with the loser dying and the gem being claimed. Each guest votes by choosing the card bearing another guest's name, and an in-story character shuffles the cards and draws two. Variations recur throughout the season: in some episodes, the nominated guests select partners to act with or for them; one vote is restricted to the women of the group; in one episode, the two guests sent into a challenge must themselves choose which other guest dies; and one episode features a group-wide challenge with no elimination. A note in the third episode warns that "after midnight, things change", and from the eighth episode onward the lieutenants hunt the guests rather than waiting to be found.

The storyline was scripted and performed with actors, while the votes and most challenge outcomes were decided in play. Graceffa has said that Liza Koshy's elimination was arranged in advance by production because of a scheduling conflict, and that his own death in the finale was decided the night before filming, in place of a planned death for the character Alison.

== Production ==
Following the first season, which won the Streamy Award for Best Ensemble Cast, YouTube renewed the series for a second season in October 2016. A teaser released across social media introduced the new cast.

== Guests ==
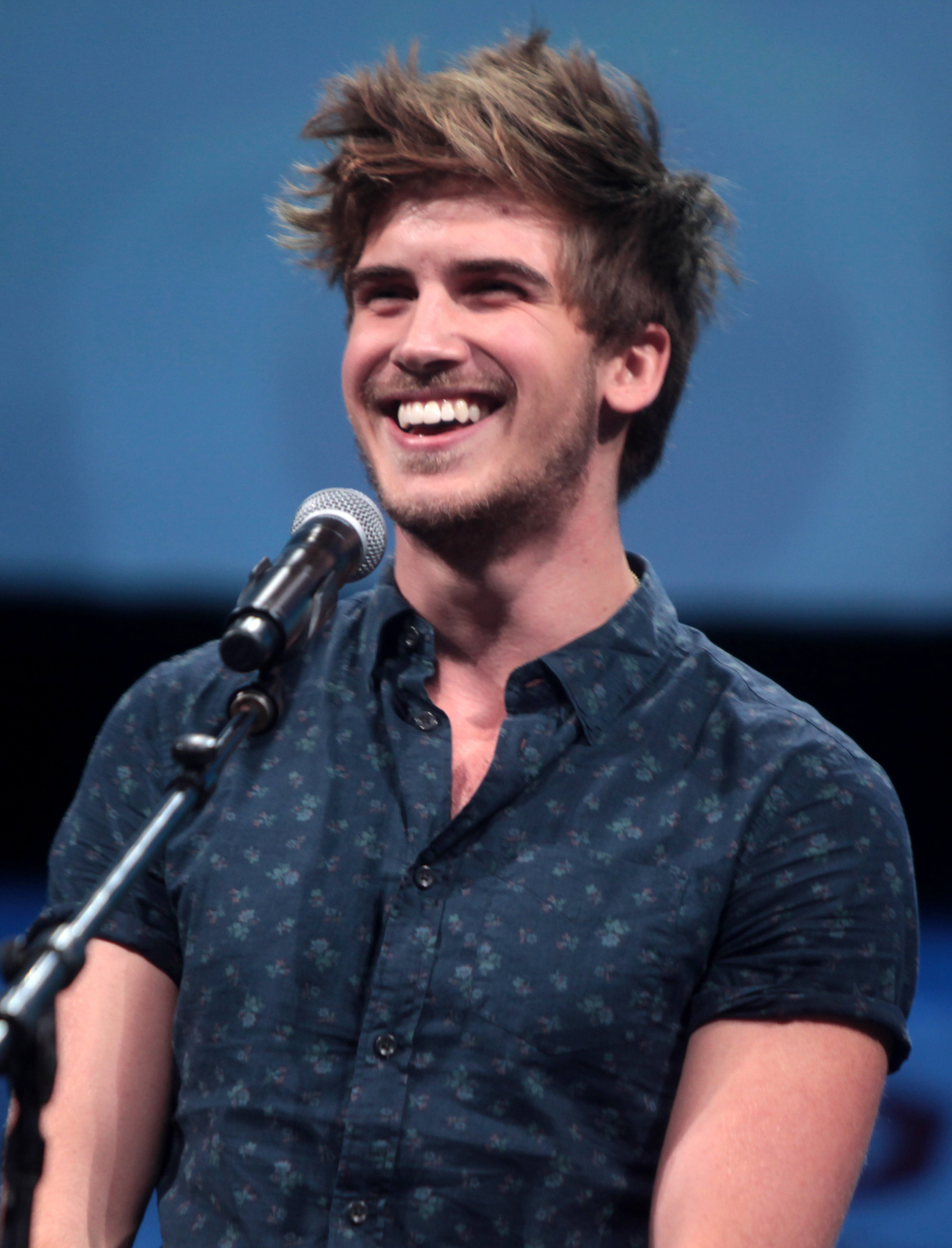
Joey Graceffa

Andrea Russett

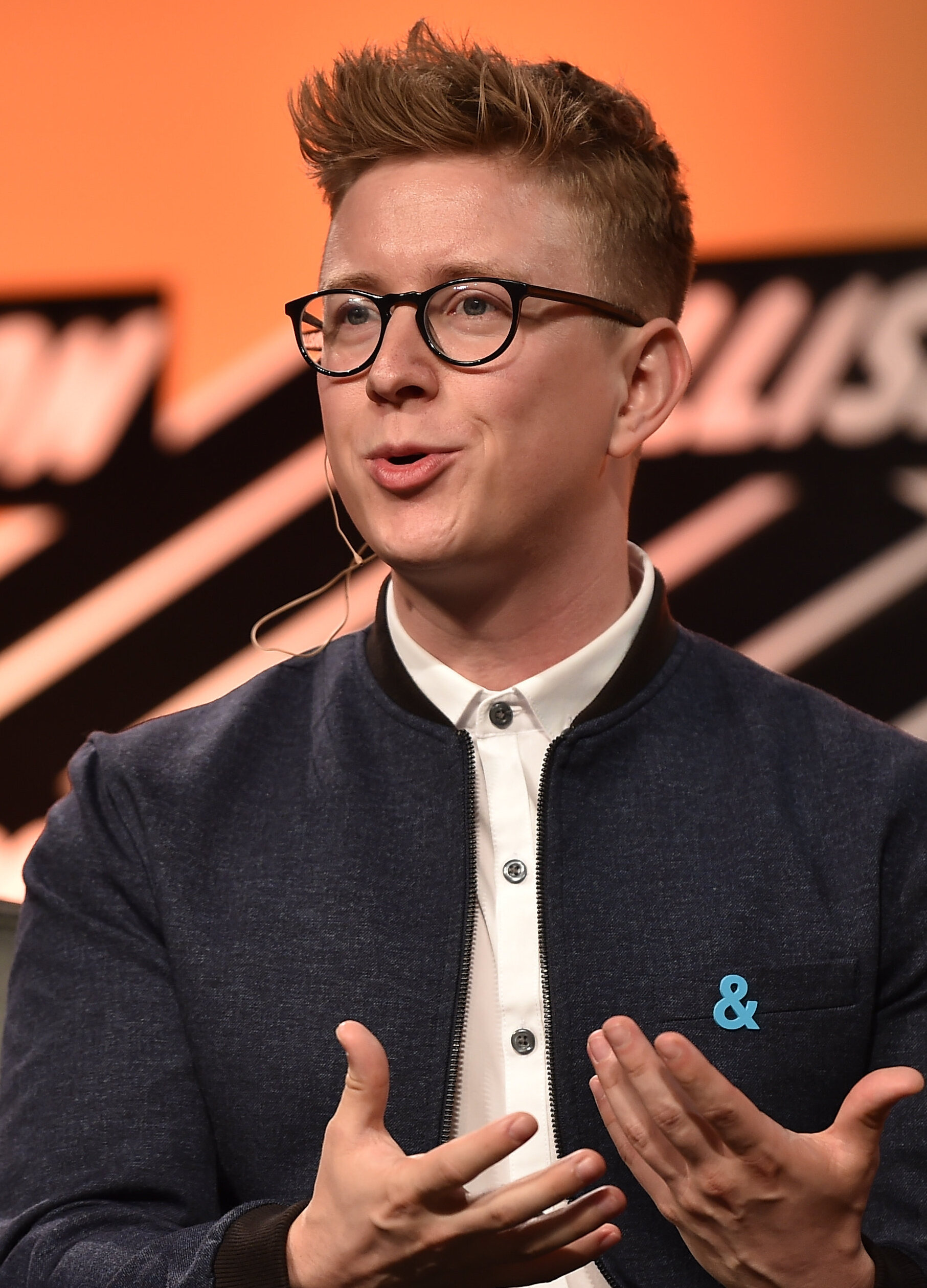
Tyler Oakley

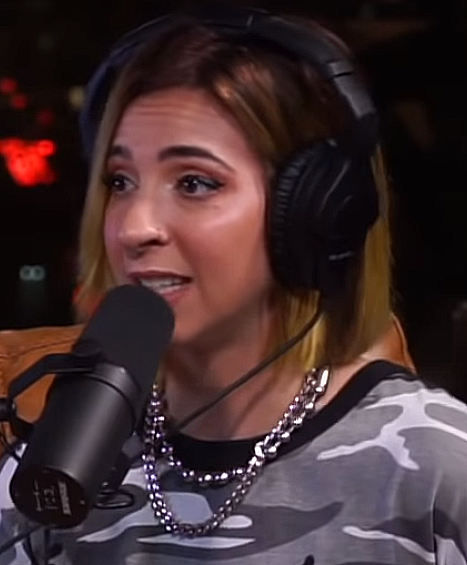
Gabbie Hanna

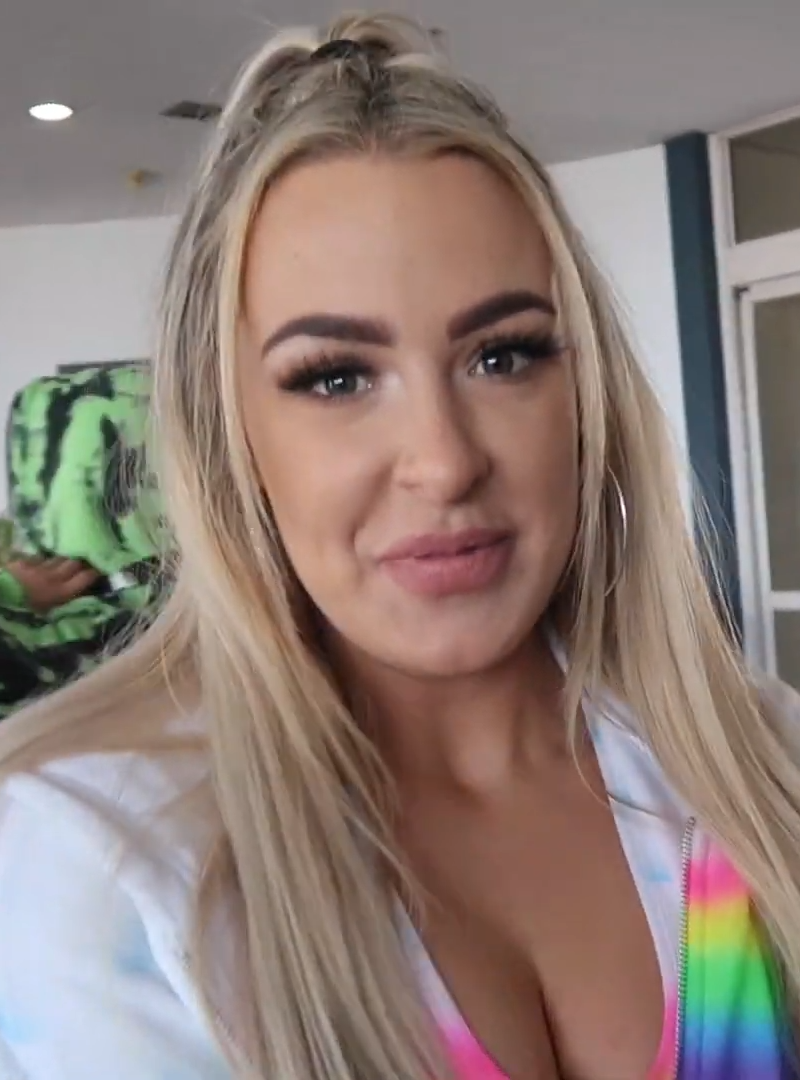
Tana Mongeau

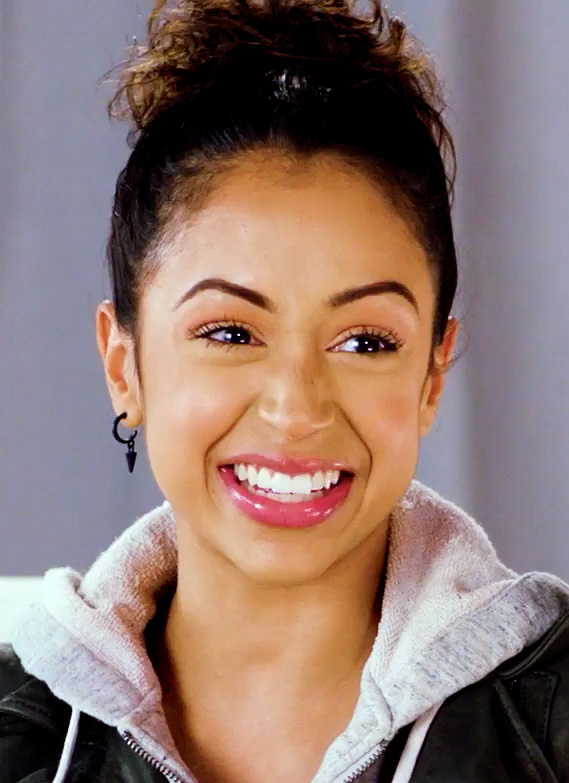
Liza Koshy

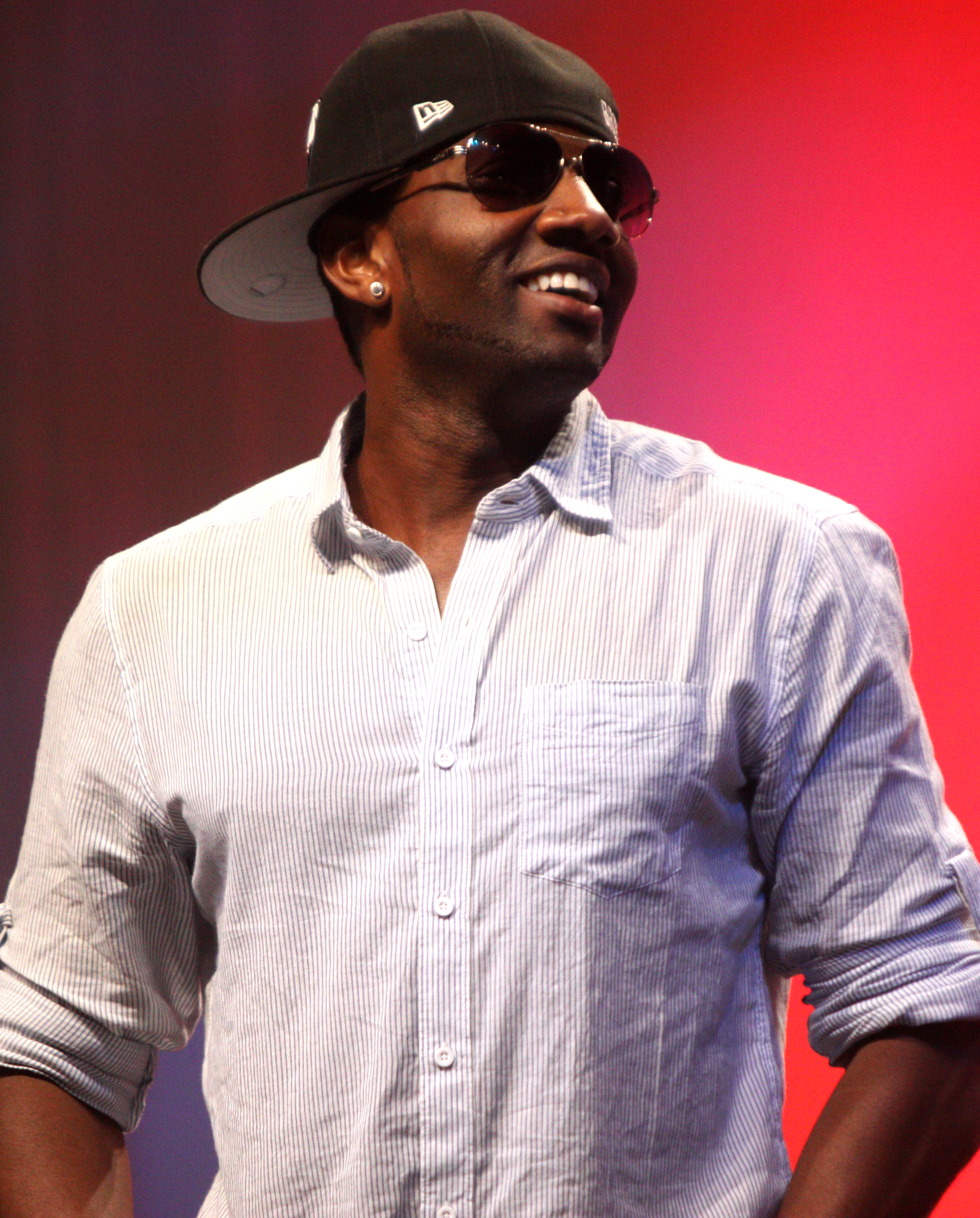
DeStorm Power

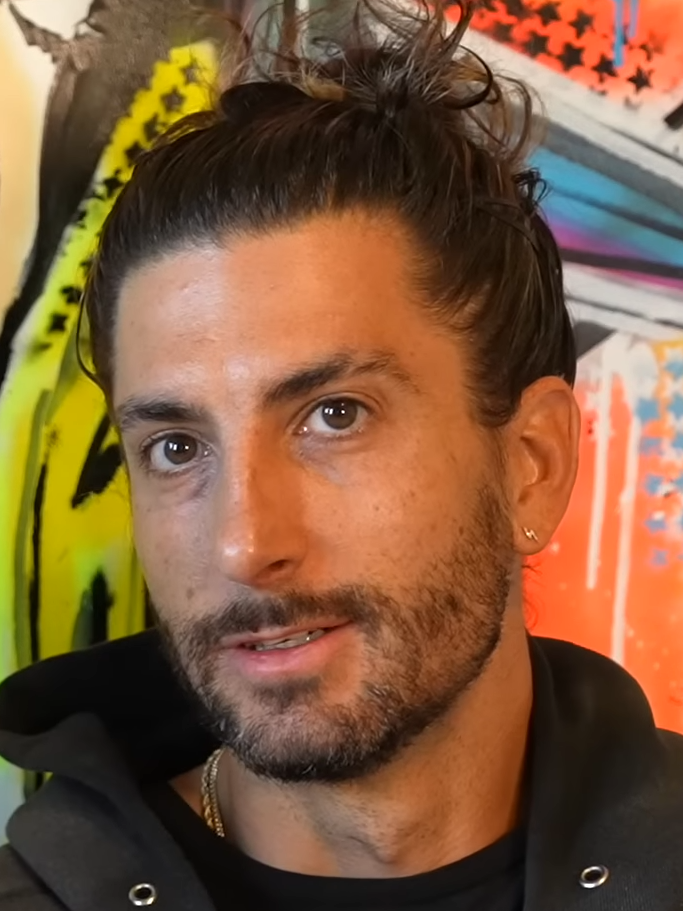
Jesse Wellens

Guests from the second season of Escape the Night
| Guest | Persona | Status | Cause of Death |
|---|---|---|---|
| Andrea Russett | The Mystic | Escaped (Episode 10) | —N/a |
| Tyler Oakley | The Thespian | Escaped (Episode 10) | —N/a |
| Joey Graceffa | The Savant | Dead (Episode 10) | Stabbed by the Sorceress |
| Alex Wassabi | The Novelist | Dead (Episode 9) | Stabbed in the chest by the Dark Dimension Gatekeeper |
| Gabbie Hanna | The Vaudevillian | Dead (Episode 7) | Heart ripped out by a Promethean |
| Tana Mongeau | The Saloon Girl | Dead (Episode 6) | Stomach slit open by the Path of Betrayal's guardian |
| Liza Koshy | The Explorer | Dead (Episode 5) (Note: Graceffa has said this elimination was arranged in advance by production because of a scheduling conflict.) | Throat slit by one of the Harpies |
| DeStorm Power | The Railroad Tycoon | Dead (Episode 4) | Shot in the chest with a magic arrow by the Dark Army |
| Jesse Wellens | The Outlaw | Dead (Episode 3) | Eaten alive by the Jorogumo |
| Lauren Riihimaki | The Engineer | Dead (Episode 2) | Eaten alive by vampires |

== Cast ==
The estate's inhabitants and the antagonists of each episode were played by actors.

=== Recurring ===
| Character | Played by | Role | Outcome |
|---|---|---|---|
| The Sorceress | Eva Augustina Sinotte | The season's main antagonist, who traps the guests at the estate | Seizes the Crown of Oblivion in the finale; stabs Joey and dies after the guests free Riley, stripping her of her power |
| Alison | Lindsay Elston | Dorian's daughter and the guests' principal helper | Sacrifices herself to a werewolf in Episode 8 to save Andrea |

=== The lieutenants ===
Within the season's story, each of the Sorceress's lieutenants holds one of the eight gems needed to rebuild the Crown of Oblivion.

| Lieutenant | Played by | Episode(s) | Notes |
|---|---|---|---|
| Dorian | Stephen Brown | 1–2 | The king of vampires; killed by Andrea |
| Jorogumo | Coel Mahal | 3 | A spider goddess served by Kira and Haruko |
| Cash | Brad Coffey | 4, 10 | A Confederate gunslinger; returns in the finale, where he is caught in the explosion that breaks the final seal |
| The Gingerbread Woman | Jackie Zane | 5 | Burned in her own oven by her prisoner, Sampson |
| The Ice Witch | Karen Sharp | 6 | Withholds her gem after Sireen's deception |
| Cedric | Timothy A. Bennett | 7 | An inventor seeking a human heart to animate his automaton bride |
| Atticus | Zac Titus (human); Ty Quiamboa (werewolf) | 8, 10 | Infected by a werewolf; returns in the finale |
| The Devourer | Alexander Ward | 8–10 | Emerges from a portal and hunts the guests in the season's final act |

=== Minor characters ===
- Nikki SooHoo as Kira and RiRia as Haruko, servants of Jorogumo
- Evan Szu as Arlyn, leader of the Dark Army, and Sean Held as Boone, captain of the Confederate Army
- Gregory Blair as Sampson, the Gingerbread Woman's prisoner, who kills her and attempts to spare both challenge competitors before being killed by the Sorceress
- Salome Azizi as Sireen, whose deception costs the guests the ice gem; Tara Parker as the Fairy, whose tears cure the Ice Witch's curse; Brandon White as Torhild the Undying, a warrior killed by the Harpies
- AJ Martin as Jetpack Girl, Cedric's former assistant, who becomes the guests' helper after Alison's death
- Angle Manuel as the Promethean Men, Cedric's soldiers
- Dillon Wrich as Dylan, infected by a werewolf, who warns the guests too late that Atticus has been infected as well
- Kei'la Ryan as Riley, the child the Sorceress once was, sealed away as the Sorceress's link to her magic

== Guest history ==
Legend:

Guest escaped the second season of Escape the Night.
Guest was voted into a challenge and won.
Guest was voted into a challenge and remained safe.
Guest was declared safe from the challenge.
Guest was immune and unable to be voted into the challenge.
Guest was selected as a partner for a challenge competitor and won, saving their partner.
Guest was selected as a partner for a challenge competitor and lost, causing their partner to die.
Guest was captured and was saved by the challenge winner.
Guest was captured and was not saved by the challenge winner.
Guest wasn't voted into a challenge but died.
Guest wasn't voted into the challenge and was chosen to die by the guests voted in the challenge.
Guest was voted into a challenge and died.

Escape The Night season 2 voting history
| | 1 | 2 | 3 | 4 | 5 | 6 | 7 | 8 | 9 | 10 |
|---|---|---|---|---|---|---|---|---|---|---|
| Voted Players | (None) | DeStorm; Lauren | Gabbie; Tana | Alex; DeStorm | Liza; Tyler | Andrea; Joey | Alex; Gabbie | Alex; Andrea; Joey; Tyler | Alex; Andrea | (None) |
| Challenge Winner(s) | (None) | DeStorm | Gabbie | Alex | Tyler | (None) | Alex | Alex; Joey; Tyler | Andrea | (None) |
| Eliminated | (None) | Lauren | Jesse | DeStorm | Liza | Tana | Gabbie | (None) | Alex | Joey |
| Andrea | No vote | DeStorm | Liza | Alex | Joey | Safe | Andrea | Safe | Andrea | Escaped |
| Tyler | No vote | DeStorm | Tana | DeStorm | Joey | Safe | Tyler | Won | Tyler | Escaped |
| Joey | No vote | Lauren | Tana | DeStorm | Liza | Safe | Joey | Won | Joey | Dead |
| Alex | No vote | Alex | Gabbie | DeStorm | Joey | Safe | Alex | Won | Alex | |
| Gabbie | No vote | Lauren | Liza | Alex | Joey | Safe | Gabbie | | | |
| Tana | No vote | Lauren | Gabbie | DeStorm | Tyler | Dead | | | | |
| Liza | No vote | DeStorm | Gabbie | DeStorm | Joey | | | | | |
| DeStorm | No vote | Lauren | Saved | Alex | | | | | | |
| Jesse | No vote | Alex | Dead | | | | | | | |
| Lauren | No vote | DeStorm | | | | | | | | |

== Challenges ==
Legend:

The guest was eliminated but was never voted for a challenge.
The guest was eliminated after their first time being voted for a challenge.
The guest was eliminated after their second time being voted for a challenge.
The guest was eliminated after their third time being voted for a challenge.

| Episode | Guest(s) | | | Challenge | Eliminated | Cause of Death |
|---|---|---|---|---|---|---|
| 2 | DeStorm Power | vs. | Lauren Riihimaki | The two completed a series of tasks while evading vampires to find a golden goblet; the loser would become the vampires' dinner. | Lauren Riihimaki | Eaten alive by vampires. |
| 3 | Gabbie Hanna | vs. | Tana Mongeau | The two women raced through an assault course to reach three guests captured by the Jorogumo; the winner chose which captive to save. | Jesse Wellens | Eaten alive by the Jorogumo. |
| 4 | Alex Wassabi | vs. | DeStorm Power | The two dove repeatedly into a swimming pool to find a single gem among hundreds of decoys. | DeStorm Power | Shot in the chest with a magic arrow by the Dark Army. |
| 5 | Liza Koshy | vs. | Tyler Oakley | The two had to eat color-coded pies and cakes around a bakery to escape being locked inside the oven. | Liza Koshy | Throat slit by one of the Harpies. |
| 6 | Andrea Russett | vs. | Joey Graceffa | The two walked the Path of Betrayal, solving riddles hidden in the woods, and together chose which of the other guests would die. | Tana Mongeau | Stomach slit open by the Path of Betrayal's guardian. |
| 7 | Alex Wassabi | vs. | Gabbie Hanna | The two completed puzzles while evading Cedric's robots, who sought one of their hearts to reanimate his bride. | Gabbie Hanna | Heart ripped out by a Promethean. |
| 8 | Everyone | | | All of the remaining guests had to complete an army assault course ahead of a pack of werewolves. | None | The guests' lives were spared. |
| 9 | Alex Wassabi | vs. | Andrea Russett | With their chosen partners, the nominees searched the dark dimension for the final gem; the one who failed would be sacrificed to the Gatekeepers. | Alex Wassabi | Stabbed in the chest by the Dark Dimension Gatekeeper. |

== Episodes ==
| No. overall | No. in season | Title | Original release date |
|---|---|---|---|
| 11 | 1 | "The Masquerade Part 1" | June 22, 2017 |
Joey has been missing for a few days, and his friends compare notes on his silence. Repeating the close of the first season, a narration reveals that the evil of the house survived within him, festered, and answered the call of a greater evil, "taking Joey through time, to another era and to another den of evil". Nine friends then receive invitations in Joey's name — "I've been away for far too long" — to a masquerade ball, each with a Victorian persona and the attire to match; only guests dressed in character can see the carriage that carries them across time. Arrival: The guests awaken in chains alongside a beaten Joey, who insists he did not invite them. He remembers little of what has happened to him, other than that vampires have been feeding on him. Joey says that he took some responsibility for his last party, because he had invited his friends into it, but that this time someone set him up. Antagonist: Dorian, the king of vampires, the Sorceress's first lieutenant. Investigation: The guests recover part of a map and learn that the only way home requires killing the vampire king — and that the only way past his guard is to impale him through the heart. They gain an ally in a prisoner of the vampires who is eager for vengeance against her captors. Eliminated: None — the episode ends on the ambush of the vampires' lair. Notes: As in the first season, the premiere establishes the season's stakes before the voting mechanism is introduced.
| 12 | 2 | "The Masquerade Part 2" | June 22, 2017 |
The guests kill Dorian, the king of vampires — Andrea striking the fatal blow — but learn that a life must be exchanged for the one they took. Voted into the challenge: DeStorm and Lauren. Each guest picks the card of the person they want in the challenge, and two cards are shuffled and drawn. Death Challenge: The two complete a series of tasks against the vampires to find a golden goblet; the loser becomes the vampires' dinner. Challenge Winner: DeStorm. Eliminated: Lauren Riihimaki (The Engineer) — eaten alive by vampires. Notes: The episode closes on the season's central revelation: a gem map showing that each of the Sorceress's eight lieutenants holds one of eight gems, all of which must be recovered to rebuild the Crown of Oblivion and defeat her. The first gem is placed.
| 13 | 3 | "Tangled Web" | June 28, 2017 |
The Jorogumo, a spider goddess and the Sorceress's second lieutenant, kidnaps three of the guests, holding them as hostages — and as food. Voted into the challenge: Gabbie and Tana, from a vote restricted to the women of the group. Death Challenge: The two women race through an assault course to reach the captured guests; the winner chooses which captive to save. Challenge Winner: Gabbie, who chooses to save DeStorm. Eliminated: Jesse Wellens (The Outlaw) — left unsaved and eaten alive by the Jorogumo. Notes: The second gem is claimed. A note from the Sorceress — "Two dead and more to go... After midnight, things change" — reveals that the guests have only four hours until midnight, establishing the season's ticking clock. One guest remarks that they are playing "a game with someone else's rules that they're constantly changing".
| 14 | 4 | "A Nation Divided" | July 5, 2017 |
The guests enter a Civil War battleground ruled by Cash, a Confederate gunslinger, and Arlyn's Dark Army. Joey is briefly possessed by the Dark Army and forced to act against his friends, deepening the group's distrust of him. Voted into the challenge: Alex and DeStorm, whose long-running feud comes to a head. Death Challenge: The two dive into a swimming pool to find a single gem hidden among hundreds of decoys. Challenge Winner: Alex. Eliminated: DeStorm Power (The Railroad Tycoon) — shot in the chest with a magic arrow by the Dark Army. Notes: The third gem is placed, leaving five. A trail of chocolate points toward the next lieutenant.
| 15 | 5 | "The Gingerbread Woman" | July 12, 2017 |
The guests encounter the Gingerbread Woman, the fourth lieutenant, and attempt to outsmart her by trading for her recipe rather than paying her price. Voted into the challenge: Liza and Tyler. Death Challenge: In a bakery filled with sweets, the two must eat their way through color-coded pies and cakes to escape being locked inside the oven. With the help of Sampson, the Gingerbread Woman's prisoner, the competitors turn the tables: Sampson kills his captor by burning her in her own oven and attempts to let both guests live. Eliminated: Liza Koshy (The Explorer) — the Sorceress appears and refuses to be cheated, declaring that one guest must die as "the rule of the game"; Sampson is killed, and Liza's throat is slit by one of the Harpies. Notes: The guests conclude that they cannot outsmart the Sorceress and must play by her rules.
| 16 | 6 | "Endless Winter Night" | July 19, 2017 |
The guests enter a frozen magical realm to win a gem from the Ice Witch, the fifth lieutenant, aided by Sireen, the warrior Torhild the Undying, and a fairy whose tears can break the Witch's curse. Voted into the challenge: Andrea and Joey. Death Challenge: The two walk the Path of Betrayal, solving riddles hidden in the woods — and must together decide which of the remaining guests will die, choosing whose stone to break. Eliminated: Tana Mongeau (The Saloon Girl) — chosen by the two walkers; her stomach is slit open by the Path of Betrayal's guardian. This is the season's only elimination decided by the nominated guests rather than the challenge outcome. Notes: The guests are themselves betrayed: because Sireen lied to the Ice Witch, the Witch withholds her gem, leaving the group with only a mysterious crystal from Sireen. Torhild is killed by the Harpies. For the first time, an episode's death buys no gem, and the guests debate whether it is now every man for himself.
| 17 | 7 | "Automaton Love Story" | July 26, 2017 |
The guests meet Cedric, an inventor and the sixth lieutenant, whose life's work — an automaton bride — has been destroyed. His assistant seeks to rebuild her, but the final component is a real, beating human heart. Voted into the challenge: Alex and Gabbie. Death Challenge: The two solve puzzles while evading Cedric's Promethean Men, who seek to seize one of them as the bride's final ingredient. Challenge Winner: Alex. Eliminated: Gabbie Hanna (The Vaudevillian) — her heart is ripped from her chest by a Promethean. Notes: The gem, set into a gear, is placed, and the episode ends five minutes before midnight, the Sorceress's promised turning point.
| 18 | 8 | "Full Moon Slaughter" | August 2, 2017 |
Midnight arrives, and the estate transforms: the lieutenants "are no longer waiting to be found", and the guests are hunted by werewolves under a full moon. Atticus, the seventh lieutenant, offers his gem in exchange for curing his son — but Dylan's warning that Atticus himself has been infected comes too late, and the guests are double-crossed by the gunslinger. Group Challenge: All of the remaining guests must complete an army assault course ahead of a pack of pursuing werewolves. Eliminated: None — the guests' lives are spared. Alison, their ally throughout the season, sacrifices herself to a werewolf to save Andrea. Notes: The guests escape with a gem but wonder aloud whether they have cheated the system — and the episode ends as the Devourer, the eighth lieutenant, erupts from a portal.
| 19 | 9 | "The Dark Dimension" | August 9, 2017 |
To recover the final gem, the guests perform unholy rites — chanting "release the secret into the world of the living" — and open the way into the dark dimension of the Devourer. Voted into the challenge: Alex and Andrea.: Alex's partner: Joey; Andrea's partner: Tyler; Death Challenge: With their partners, the nominees search the dark dimension for the last gem; the one who fails becomes a sacrifice to the Gatekeepers. Challenge Winner: Andrea. Eliminated: Alex Wassabi (The Novelist) — stabbed in the chest by the Dark Dimension Gatekeeper. Notes: With the final gem placed, the Crown of Oblivion assembles before the surviving guests.
| 20 | 10 | "The Sorceress" | August 16, 2017 |
A flashback shows the Sorceress, once poor and hated, accepting the offer of "the ancient ones" and claiming the Crown of Oblivion; its gems were later scattered, and only "souls from the future" could rebuild it. In the present, the guests complete the Crown by recovering its center stone, and Joey, as the group's leader, places it on his head — but Cash intercepts them, and the Sorceress seizes the Crown, declaring that she has waited more than a century to wear it. Riley: A book reveals Riley, "the child the Sorceress once was", sealed away so that the Sorceress might become a monster. Riley is the Sorceress's link to the "cursed god's magic" she wields, and freeing her will strip the Sorceress of her power. Hunted by the Devourer, Atticus, and Cash, the guests break three leviathan seals — the last by luring the lieutenants to a dynamite charge at the pond — and free Riley from a glass box in a tree house. Endgame: With the Sorceress collapsed on the stairs and the Crown beside her, Joey reaches for it despite a warning to wait. The Sorceress stabs him before dying. Eliminated: Joey Graceffa (The Savant) — stabbed by the Sorceress. Escaped: Andrea Russett and Tyler Oakley, who leave for home, reflecting that no one will believe they defeated a Sorceress and regretting that they must leave behind the body of a friend who had come so close to escaping.

== See also ==
- Murder in Small Town X
- The Murder Game
- Whodunnit?
- The Quest
