= Don't Wait =

Don't Wait may refer to:

== Music ==
=== Albums ===
- Don't Wait (album), a 2006 album by Adie

=== Songs ===
- "Don't Wait" (Dashboard Confessional song), 2006
- "Don't Wait", song by J.J. Cale from 1982 album Grasshopper
- "Don't Wait", song by Mapei
- "Don't Wait", song by Hit the Lights Skip School, Start Fights
- "Don't Wait", song by Boxer (band) Patto, Halsall 1976
- "Don't Wait", song by Johnnie Taylor Ija' Sun Perri 1983
- "Don't Wait", song by Noiseworks J. Stevens, J. Stanley, S. Fraser 1986
- "Don't Wait", song by Dala from Who Do You Think You Are, 2007
- "Don't Wait", song by The Duke Spirit 2011
- "Don't Wait" (Joey Graceffa song), a 2015 song by Joey Graceffa
