= The Avenue (web series) =

- Genre: Reality
- Starring: Gigi Gorgeous; Arta Ghanbari; Rachel Guest; Claire Jzekova; Vienna Mars
- Opening theme: "Call 911 (Florrie Remix)" by Florrie
- Country of origin: Canada
- No. of seasons: 2

Production
- Executive producers: Scott Fisher; Jacob Morris; Stéphane Paré

Original release
- Network: YouTube
- Release: March 15, 2011 – April 14, 2013

The Avenue is a Canadian reality-based web series starring YouTube personality Gigi Gorgeous. The series premiered on January 25, 2011 on The Avenue YouTube channel.

== Background and release ==
The first season was distributed primarily on Blip with the second season only on YouTube. Scott Fisher, Jacob Morris and Stéphane Paré serve as executive producers and were all in their second year of studying at Ryerson University (now Toronto Metropolitan University).

The second season of The Avenue premiered in November 2012 with a larger concept. New characters had been added including Gigi’s old friend Vienna Mars who immediately creates controversy by sizing up his new big city friends and his next door neighbor, Shannon. As well as his love interest, Jay. https://torontolife.com/culture/the-avenue-recap-episode-2-just-dan-ce-like-the-lady-gaga-song-only-more-tragic/ Aspiring fashion model, Jessica, did not return for a second season.

== Controversy ==
The series received some negative press attention for the way it portrayed Toronto, with VICE writing: "This isn’t the first time that self-involved rich kids have used their assets to transform their over privileged lives into what they think is quality television."
