= Children of Eden (novel) =

2016 novel by Joey Graceffa

- Author: Joey Graceffa
- Language: English
- Genre: Sci-Fi, fantasy, dystopia
- Published: October 14, 2016 (Keywords Press)
- Publisher: Atria/Keywords Press, an imprint of Simon & Schuster
- Publication place: United States
- ISBN: 978-1501146558

Children of Eden is a dystopian young adult novel released by YouTube personality Joey Graceffa on October 4, 2016.

The novel was listed, and debuted on, The New York Times' Best Seller List, within the Young Adult Hardcover category on the week of October 23, 2016, according to the Times.

On May 31, 2017, Graceffa announced in his YouTube channel the sequel to his young adult novel. The sequel, titled, Elites of Eden, which follows an "Elite" and lilac-haired girl named Yarrow and Lark, respectively, was released October 3, 2017.

== Reception ==
Reviews of the book have been mixed, with critic Rachel Hyland of Geek Speak Magazine writing, "Graceffa knows a lot about YA dystopian conventions, and they are all present and accounted for here. This is by no means a bad thing – an enjoyable romp through this genre doesn't necessarily require too much divergence (no pun intended) from the established norms – but it is worth noting that most everything in his Eden has pretty much happened before, in one way or another. Still, it is fun to see just how those ever-trusty elements are put together, and there is a nice twist on the almost essential love triangle that is actually pretty awesome."

Common Sense Media gave the novel a rating of three out of five stars, stating, in part, "This perplexing novel uses every convention of dystopian YA science fiction... Children of Eden's main character, Rowan, never seems to stop talking and stating the obvious. The world-building doesn't seem to make much sense, and coincidence seems to be the major motivator of the plot. Many readers will no doubt be attracted by the story's breathless earnestness, but the more critical among them may roll their eyes."

Kirkus Reviews also gave the book a mixed review, explaining, "The tropes of the teen dystopia abound, but Graceffa keeps things moving quickly enough that readers won't mind. ... After an intrusively expository start, Rowan's journey from loner to rebel is smartly paced and cleverly constructed. ... the aftertaste of Eden has a bit of a 'been there, done that' feel, but the author injects just enough original thought and spins the yarn fast enough that readers will still have a good time." The review concludes, commenting, "A promising start that gets more right than wrong."
