= Isa (film) =

- Written by: Jose Nestor Marquez
- Directed by: Jose Nestor Marquez
- Starring: Jeanette Samano, Sabi, Eric Ochoa
- Country of origin: United States
- Original language: English

Production
- Producers: Steak House, Valerie Stadler
- Production company: Fluency

Original release
- Network: Syfy
- Release: May 21, 2014

ISA is a 2014 made-for-television, sci-fi, psychological thriller movie about Isa Reyes, a high school teen who discovers that a chip in her brain allows her to unlock repressed memories through her dreams. It premiered on the Syfy channel on June 11, 2014, and stars Jeanette Samano, Sabi, Eric Ochoa, Ana Layevska, with Timothy DeLaGhetto and Fernando Allende. It also aired on the Chiller, mun2 and Telemundo networks and iTunes. It was produced by Fluency.

== Plot ==
Isa Reyes (Jeanette Samano) is graduating from high school to study computer science when she is hit by a car. At the hospital, doctors find a foreign object inside her brain giving off a radio signal. That night, Isa dreams that she is being driven home by her deceased parents, and her mother tells her there was no accident. She wakes up inside the dream and breaks into a vault wherein she finds a golden cocoon. As Isa is dreaming, her phone is transmitting a radio signal to two engineers in Mexico who are monitoring her dream remotely. The engineers interpret Isa's dream as a break-in and reboot their system, causing Isa to wake up in pain. She's holding the very cocoon she dreamt about.

A female scientist (Ana Layevska) reports the break-in to a shadowy banker (Fernando Allende), promising she will retrieve the chip that was used. The scientist sends a henchman, Borroso (Khotan Fernández), to track down the people Isa mentioned in her dream. When Borroso identifies the chip as belonging to a high school student, the scientist concludes that the computer break-in was done by "one of the children" upon which she has been experimenting. Borroso visits Isa's school and shows her a video that has been doctored to work as an evoked potential test for anyone implanted with the chip. Isa goes into a dream state in which her chip is activated and connects to the scientist's system. While the scientist observes her unconscious activity, Isa learns more about her true past in this dream by following a monarch butterfly back to Mexico. The scientist concludes that Isa was stolen from her lab when Isa was a child and that in the intervening years Isa's chip has become very powerful and could be quite lucrative to the banker.

After Isa finds a photograph from her most recent dream on her phone, she confronts her adoptive aunt and uncle (Rebecca Manríquez and Rubén Morales) who confess that they are not related and that she was smuggled into the U.S. as an infant by unknown migrants. Isa decides to run away having interpreted her dreams as containing the coordinates to her true home in Michoacán, Mexico. Borroso kidnaps Isa and plugs a cable into her head, allowing the scientist to download the evolved software in Isa's chip by forcing Isa to relive her worst nightmare. Isa manages to break out of the nightmare by interpreting it as a representation of her father who rescued her from the scientist's lab and sent her off with migrants to save her life.

Isa wakes up inside Borroso's lair and disorients him by materializing a swarm of hundreds of monarch butterflies. Isa's friends (Eric Ochoa and Sabi) help her escape while the scientist is punished by the shadowy banker as a result of Isa's attack on their computer system which has triggered a large problem in the stock market.

== Cast ==
- Jeanette Samano as Isa Reyes
- Sabi as Nataly Gomez
- Eric Ochoa as Officer Jaime Diaz
- Ana Layevska as Dedal Copula
- Khotan Fernández as Borroso
- Rebeca Manriquez as Tia Maria
- Ruben Morales as Tio Jose
- Fernando Allende as Mr. Gros
- Timothy DeLaGhetto as Big Boy
- Tony Vela as Ingeniero Ramirez
- Adrian Carvajal as Ingeniero Jimenez

== Production ==
ISA was written and directed for film studio Fluency by Jose Nestor Marquez. The film's tagline is "They stole her dreams. Now she's their nightmare." The picture was shot by Anne Etheridge (who previously shot Liza Johnson's "Return (2011)" with Linda Cardellini, Michael Shannon and John Slattery), edited by Harry Yoon ("Drunktown's Finest", "The Newsroom"). The score was composed by Michael Tuller, a longtime collaborator of Trent Reznor who also worked on "The Girl with the Dragon Tattoo (2011)" and "The Social Network". It was produced by Steak House ("Life Partners") and Valerie Stadler ("Sunset Stories"). The soundtrack also features songs by Queens of the Stone Age, Yellow Claw (Mad Decent) and Los Payos.

== Release ==
ISA premiered in Los Angeles on May 21, 2014. It premiered in New York City on May 28, 2014.

Television premieres:

- SyFy – June 11, 2014
- Chiller – June 17, 2014
- Mun2 – June 27, 2014
- Telemundo – September 6, 2014

The film is also available on several streaming platforms including iTunes, Google Play and Xbox Video.

== Critical reception ==
Joshua Silverman of the site Constantly Calibrating asserts "The film does an interesting job of taking classic sci-fi ideas — in this case exploring the evolution of technology and how it can be used to control and subvert — and showing multiple facets of it.

Annalee Newitz of io9 says "What's terrific about Isa is that it's playing in the same thematic sandbox as other great works of contemporary science fiction, from Orphan Black to Ramez Naam's Nexxus series, but takes them in a new direction." She goes on, "That's why we love this movie. It makes no apologies for having a female hero, and makes no big deal out of it, either. Ultimately it's about a group of characters, and how they function in a future world of brain implants and programmable minds."

Robert Lloyd of Los Angeles Times called Isa, a clever, bilingual film with "a good deal of poetry, and some subtextual resonance germane to the characters: about crossing borders, navigating different worlds; whether or not it was intended, it can handle the migration metaphors."

Susana Polo of The Mary Sue praised the film while also offering some critiques, "As is not always the case with dream-sequence-heavy movies, I found ISA's to have just the right mix of surreal creativity and calm mundanity. I itched to replay a Myst game as Isa solved each surreal dreamscape puzzle that lead her closer to unlocking the bad guys' secrets. So there's a lot to like about ISA, I just wish it hadn't been sorta slow and ultimately not particularly cohesive as a narrative."
