= Rebels of Eden =

2018 novel by Joey Graceffa

- Author: Joey Graceffa
- Cover artist: Andrey Lukovnikov
- Language: English
- Genre: Sci-Fi, fantasy, dystopian
- Published: October 2, 2018
- Publisher: Atria/Keywords Press, an imprint of Simon & Schuster
- Publication place: United States
- ISBN: 978-1471167331
- Preceded by: Elites of Eden

Rebels of Eden is a dystopian young adult novel by YouTuber and author Joey Graceffa. It is the third and final book in his Children of Eden book series, following his second title, Elites of Eden. It was released on October 2, 2018.

== Plot summary ==
Rowan is finally in Harmonia, an Earth-friendly, sustainable commune in the wilderness she always thought was dead. Even in this idyllic world, she finds no peace. Harmonia has strict rules – and dire consequences. Thinking about Eden is forbidden, but she's determined to rescue the loved ones she left behind. Though they are in terrible danger, her pleas for help are ignored.

After months of living as one with nature, a shocking reminder of her past pushes Rowan to act. With the help of new friends, she infiltrates Eden. What she discovers is even worse than the situation she left behind. In the chaos of civil war, Rowan and her friends join forces with the second children and other rebels trapped inside. They fight for their lives, and for the future of humanity in this broken Earth.
