= In Real Life: My Journey to a Pixelated World =

Book by Joey Graceffa

- Author: Joey Graceffa
- Language: English
- Genre: Memoir
- Published: May 19, 2015 (Keywords Press)
- Publisher: Keywords Press, an imprint of Simon & Schuster
- Publication place: United States
- ISBN: 9781476794303
- Dewey Decimal: 791.45028/GRACEFFA
- LC Class: CT275.G6285 A3 2015

In Real Life: My Journey to a Pixelated World is a memoir released by Joey Graceffa on May 19, 2015. It was released through Atria/Keywords Press, an imprint of Simon & Schuster.

The memoir was listed on The New York Times Best Seller list for July 2015 on the "celebrities" list. Common Sense Media gave the book a three out of five stars, saying, "Some portions of the book are more engaging than others. The sections on his childhood are riveting, but when he tries to make his first forays into dating sound more dramatic than they are, the narrative falls flat. ...Many kids who feel that other people don't understand what they're going through will connect with this book and find it helpful."
