= Elites of Eden =

2017 novel by Joey Graceffa

- Author: Joey Graceffa
- Cover artist: Kristi Neilson
- Language: English
- Genre: Sci-Fi, fantasy, dystopian
- Published: October 3, 2017 (Keywords Press)
- Publisher: Atria/Keywords Press, an imprint of Simon & Schuster
- Publication place: United States
- ISBN: 9781501174537
- Preceded by: Children of Eden (novel)
- Followed by: Rebels of Eden

Elites of Eden is a dystopian young adult novel by American Joey Graceffa. It is the sequel to Children of Eden and was released on October 3, 2017.

== Plot summary ==
Yarrow is an elite: rich, regal, destined for greatness. She's the daughter of one of the most powerful women in Eden. At the exclusive Oaks boarding school, she makes life miserable for anyone foolish enough to cross her. Her life is one wild party after another; until she meets a fascinating, lilac-haired girl named Lark.

Meanwhile, there is Rowan, who has been either hiding or running all her life. As an illegal second child in a strictly regulated world, her very existence is a threat to society, punishable by death or worse. After her father betrayed her family, and after her mother were killed by the government, Rowan discovered a whole city of people like herself. Safe in an underground sanctuary that also protected the last living tree on Earth, Rowan found friendship, and maybe more, in a fearless hero named Lachlan. But when she was captured by the government, her fate was uncertain.

When these two girls discover the thread that binds them together, the collision of memories means that their lives may change drastically—and that Eden may never be the same.

== Reception ==
The book received mediocre reviews. Common Sense Media gave the novel a rating of three out of five stars, criticizing the plot but commenting that stating, "younger teens may enjoy the hyped-up storytelling, where almost anything can happen at any time, as the children of Eden choose their own destinies." Kirkus Reviews was more favorable suggesting it was better than the first in the series and that it subverts traditional YA love triangles but noting that the start of the novel can be hard to get through due to unpleasant characters. Kristen Rademacher writing for School Library Journal called the book "melodramatic."
