= Gigi Gorgeous =

Canadian YouTuber, actress and model (born 1992)

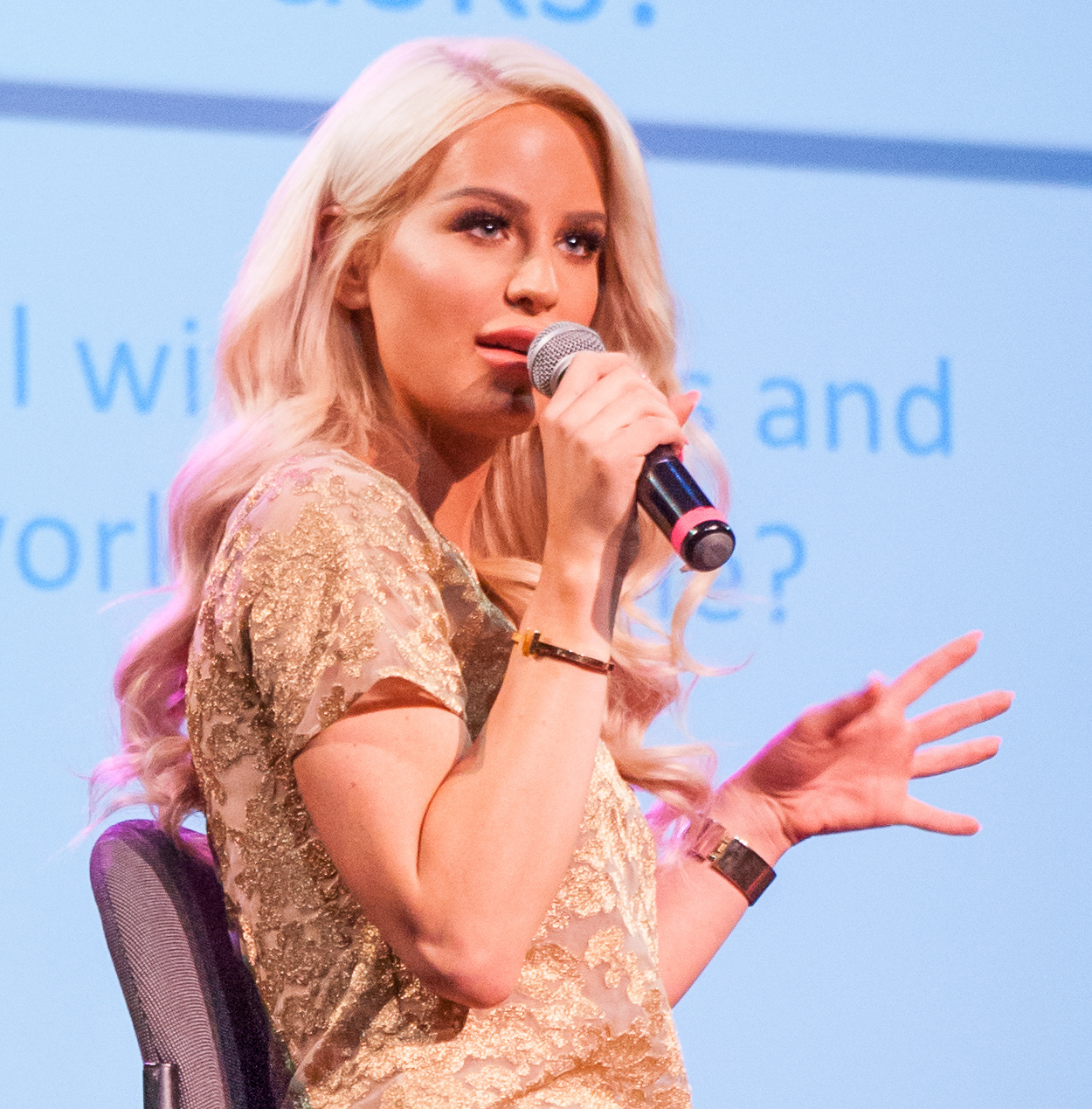
- Lazzarato speaking at the Trans Day of Visibility celebration in San Francisco, March 2017
- Born: April 20, 1992 (age 34); Montreal, Quebec, Canada
- Other name: Gigi Lazzarato
- Occupations: YouTuber; model; actor
- Years active: 2008–present
- Agent: Select Management Group (LA)
- Spouse: Nats Getty (m. 2019–2025)

YouTube information
- Channel: Gigi Gorgeous
- Years active: 2008–present
- Genres: Fashion, makeup, vlogs
- Subscribers: 2.66 million
- Views: 492 million
- Last updated: April 8, 2026

Giselle Loren "Gigi" Lazzarato (born April 20, 1992), formerly Getty, known professionally as Gigi Gorgeous, is a Canadian YouTuber, socialite, actress, and model.

In 2008, Lazzarato began uploading video blogs onto streaming platform YouTube. Her videos achieved popularity and established an online following. During the following years, Lazzarato uploaded regularly to the channel along with creating and starring in the reality program The Avenue (2011–2013). Following a brief hiatus, she gained media attention after coming out as a transgender woman in 2013, and began going by Gigi Gorgeous. During 2014, Lazzarato personally documented her gender transition through social media profiles, notably through videos revolving around cosmetic procedures, which obtained viral status. In 2016, an incident involving Lazzarato being deported from Dubai due to her status as a transgender woman resulted in widespread media coverage. Lazzarato was the subject of This is Everything: Gigi Gorgeous (2017), a Barbara Kopple-directed documentary that followed life going through gender transition. The film premiered at the Sundance Film Festival and went on to have a limited theatrical release and several accolades including a Streamy.

Besides personality work, Lazzarato has dabbled in acting and modeling work. Her performance credits include starring in fellow YouTuber Shane Dawson's short film I Hate Myselfie (2015) and its sequel, along with guest appearances in television series Project Runway All Stars, Me and My Grandma, Good Work, and Trailblazers, amongst others. Through modeling, Lazzarato has appeared on the covers of Paper and Fashion, been featured in spreads for Galore, Kode, Refinery29, and Out and served as a frequent muse of August Getty Atelier. In 2019, she authored the book He Said, She Said: Lessons, Stories, and Mistakes From My Transgender Journey.

== Early life ==
Lazzarato was born in Montreal, Québec, to Judith Lazzarato (née Belding) and David Lazzarato, a media consultant at Yellow Media. She is of Italian, Lebanese, English and French heritage.

Lazzarato was raised Roman Catholic and grew up attending Catholic schools. As a young adult, Lazzarato competed in diving competitions. Her mother, Judith, died of leukemia on February 3, 2012, at Princess Margaret Cancer Centre, Toronto.

== Career ==
=== 2008–13: Beginnings on YouTube ===
Lazzarato operated a makeup tutorial YouTube channel that began in 2008 while in the eleventh grade, when a friend mentioned seeing a makeup video by Michelle Phan on YouTube. Lazzarato first came out as gay at age 19. Since transitioning, her YouTube channel started to include more vlogs, fashion, and lifestyle videos.

On January 18, 2011, Lazzarato announced The Avenue, a YouTube-based reality series. The show premiered on March 15 of that year on YouTube with distribution by Blip. The show's last episode aired on April 14, 2013.

=== 2014–16: Gender transition and appearances ===
Lazzarato was awarded the LogoTV Trailblazing Social Creator Award in 2014 for being an advocate on behalf of LGBT youth. She frequently attends BeautyCon conventions to meet with fans and sit in on panels about makeup techniques and the cosmetics industry. Lazzarato modeled for designer Marco Marco and walked in the 2014 and 2015 Marco Marco Fashion Shows.

Lazzarato has used internet celebrity status to bring awareness to transgender issues, the LGBT community, and anti-bullying. Her image was featured in a montage of transgender celebrities in the ABC 20/20 documentary about Caitlyn Jenner's transition.

In early 2015, Lazzarato starred in fellow YouTuber Shane Dawson's debut short film I Hate Myselfie as Amber. Lazzarato later reprised the role of Amber in I Hate Myselfie 2.

In June 2015, it was announced that Lazzarato had teamed up with singer Miley Cyrus and had joined Cyrus' Happy Hippie Foundation's Marie Claire "#InstaPride" campaign. The campaign included a series of photos and an announcement by Cyrus that they were working on a secret project. The project later turned out to be a spread in the magazine Marie Claire featuring them both. Gigi signed a partnership with 'Too Faced Cosmetics' in which she starred in the cosmetic commercial film "Better Than Sex" which premiered on July 9, 2015. At the 2015 MTV Video Music Awards, Lazzarato, along with a group of drag queens, introduced Miley Cyrus for the debut performance of "Dooo It!" from Cyrus's new album Miley Cyrus and her Dead Petz.

She appeared on Entertainment Tonight as a special guest that same month. Gigi was featured in Kylie Jenner's app "Kylie", that features several make-up tip videos. On September 18, she won the Streamy Award for "Best Beauty Series". It was announced on October 7 that she would star in Adam Lambert's video for her song "Another Lonely Night".

==== 2016: Dubai incident ====
On August 9, 2016, Lazzarato was detained in the United Arab Emirates. Her passport was taken by airport officials and immigration officers at the Dubai International Airport. She was denied entry to Dubai for "imitation of women by men", despite the fact that, as confirmed by Lazzarato, "the gender on [her] passport states female and not male." The "imitation of women by men" is illegal in the UAE, and violators can face up to a year in jail. She was released after being detained for five hours.

The "#JusticeForGigi" hashtag surfaced on Twitter, with fans and supporters calling for her release and a reform in anti-LGBTQ laws. It was not the first time a transgender person had been detained in Dubai. In 2014, two Brazilian transgender women were also detained and had their passports taken. Before leaving Dubai for Sweden, Lazzarato responded to the incident by calling for equality and legal protections for LGBTQ people.

=== 2017–present: This Is Everything ===
In January 2017, the documentary This Is Everything: Gigi Gorgeous, starring Lazzarato, directed by Barbara Kopple, premiered at the Sundance Film Festival. On June 11, Gorgeous watched the documentary with Katy Perry on Perry's four-day livestream event, Katy Perry Live: Witness World Wide.

In June 2017, Lazzarato was named to the Time magazine list of the 25 most influential people on the Internet.

In 2019, Lazzarato published a memoir, titled He Said, She Said: Lessons, Stories, and Mistakes From My Transgender Journey. In October 2019, she announced a makeup collection coming out with Ipsy in November 2019. The collection features various beauty products related to makeup.

== Personal life ==
Lazzarato is a practicing Roman Catholic and describes herself as religious. She is vegan.

=== Transition ===
Lazzarato came out as a transgender woman in December 2013. On March 8, 2014, she legally changed her name to Gigi Loren Lazzarato.

In a September 2015 issue of People, Lazzarato credited "transgender model and performing artist Amanda Lepore and the death of my mother for sparking my transition."

=== Relationships ===
In October 2014, Lazzarato began dating Cory Binney, the half-brother of drag queen Alaska Thunderfuck, after meeting at a club. The pair first broke up in May or June 2015, inspiring one of her most viewed videos titled "Single Life (My Break Up)", a music video to "What the Hell" by Avril Lavigne. They got back together in July 2015 before permanently splitting in November 2015.

Lazzarato came out as a lesbian in a YouTube video on September 14, 2016. She began dating Nats Getty, an heir and member of the Getty family, shortly after meeting him at Paris Fashion Week in 2016 while working as a model for Getty's brother, August Getty. In March 2018, Getty proposed to Lazzarato at the Château de Vaux-le-Vicomte in France. On July 12, 2019, Lazzarato and Getty married in a private ceremony at Rosewood Miramar Beach in Montecito, California. On April 9, 2021, shortly after Getty came out as transgender, Lazzarato stated that she is pansexual, explaining that she "didn't fall in love with Nats because of his gender, I fell in love with the person that he is." Getty filed for divorce from Lazzarato on July 2, 2025.

== Filmography ==
=== Film ===
Year	Title	Role	Notes	Refs.
2015	I Hate Myselfie	Amber	Short film	
2015	Better Than Sex	Gigi	Short film	
2015	I Hate Myselfie 2	Amber	Short film	
2017	This is Everything: Gigi Gorgeous	Herself	Documentary	

=== Television ===
Year	Title	Notes	Refs.
2009	The Campus	Lead role; 7 episodes	
2010	MTV'S The After Show		
2011–2013	The Avenue	21 episodes	
2013–2015	Celebrity Style Story	Host; 13 episodes	
2013	The Listener	Episode: "The Blue Line"	
2013	Project Runway All Stars	Episode: "#Nina'sTrending"	
2014	Trailblazers	Award ceremony	
2014	PopSugar TV	Episode: "Talks Beauty Tips and Fashion At BeautyCon LA"	
2015	About Bruce	TV special	
2015	Good Work		
2015	Access Hollywood	3 episodes	
2015	Daily Share		
2015	MTV Video Music Award	Award ceremony	
2015	Entertainment Tonight		
2015	VH1's Streamy Awards	Award ceremony	
2015	FOX News	1 episode	
2015	The Marco Marco Show	Recurring role; 3 episodes	
2015	Beauty TV	Episode: "Glowing with Gigi Gorgeous"	
2015	Bro'Laska	Episode: "Cory's Tips for Getting Swole"	
2015	What's Trending	Episode: "Gigi Gorgeous Talks Trans Rights and LGBT Equality"	
2015	Help, My Face Is Fucked!	Recurring guest; 4 episodes	
2015	PerezHiltonTV	Episode: "Behind The Scenes of Gigi Gorgeous' Photoshoot"	
2015	GLSEN Respect Awards	Award ceremony	
2016	Gigi Gorgeous's Love Letter		
2016	Nightcap	Episode: "The Horny Host" as Herself	
2016	American Music Awards	Award ceremony	
2016	Thread of Man	Documentary short	
2017	Me and My Grandma	Episode: "Elderboo"	
2017	Access Hollywood	Guest appearance	
2017	Shane and Friends	Episode: "Gigi Gorgeous"	
2017	Daily Pop	Guest appearance	
2017	Not Too Deep with Grace Helbig	Episode: "Gigi Gorgeous"	
2017	Katy Perry Live: Witness World Wide	House guest	
2017	Last Week	Episode: "Last Week I Snuggled Puppers"	
2018	Undivided Attention	Host	
2020, 2025	Upload	Vogue interviewer. Jordan. Gigi	3 episodes
2021	Canada's Drag Race	Guest Judge - Season 2 Episode 6 "The Sinner's Ball"	
2023	Hell's Kitchen	Uncredited guest diner; Episode: "Just Bring the DARN Fish!"	

=== Music videos ===
Year	Title	Artist	Role	Notes
2015	"Another Lonely Night"	Adam Lambert	Wedding celebrant	
2018	"Aileen"	Willam Belli	Aileen Wuornos	
2019	"Do Not Disturb"	Steve Aoki, Bella Thorne	The Countess	
2019	"God Control"	Madonna	Herself	
2024	"Days of Girlhood"	Dylan Mulvaney	Girl at Pool	

== Awards ==
Year	Category	Award	Recipient	Result
2014	Trailblazing Social Creator	Logo TV Awards	Herself	Won
2015	Best Beauty Series	Streamy Awards	Herself	Won
2016	Best Beauty Series	Streamy Awards	Herself	Nominated
2017	YouTuber of the Year	Shorty Awards	Herself	Won
2017	Best Feature	Streamy Awards	This Is Everything	Won
2017	Best Documentary	Streamy Awards	This Is Everything	Nominated
2017	Most Compelling Living Subject of a Documentary	Critics' Choice Awards	Herself (for This Is Everything)	Won
2019	United Award	Streamy Awards	Herself	Won
