= Timothy DeLaGhetto =

American YouTube personality, rapper, and comedian

Tim Chantarangsu
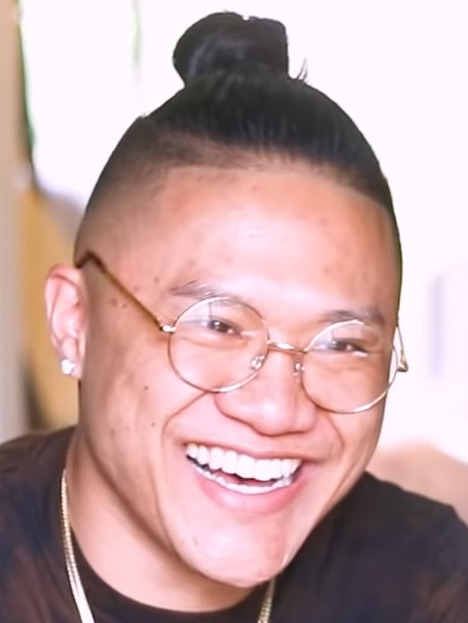
- Chantarangsu in 2017
- Born: Tim Chantarangsu; March 6, 1986 (age 40); Billings, Montana, U.S.
- Other names: Timothy DeLaGhetto (2006–2020); Traphik (2006–2016)
- Education: California State University, Long Beach (dropped out)
- Occupations: television/internet personality; rapper; comedian; actor
- Spouse: Chia Habte (m. 2018)
- Children: 2
- Musical career
- Origin: Long Beach, California, U.S. Paramount, California, U.S.
- Genre: Hip hop
- Years active: 2006–present

Twitch information
- Channel: timchantarangsu
- Followers: 3 thousand

YouTube information
- Channels: Tim Chantarangsu
- Years active: 2006–present
- Genres: Music, vlogs, pranks, Sketch comedy
- Subscribers: 4.21 million
- Views: 933 million
- Last updated: May 14, 2026
- Website: timothydelaghetto.com

Tim Chantarangsu (born March 6, 1986), formerly known as Timothy DeLaGhetto and Traphik, is an American internet and television personality and rapper. He is best known from the improv comedy show Wild 'N Out, where he was a cast member from 2013 to 2018 and 2020 to 2021.

Chantarangsu is also known as the co-host of the food-based web shows Basic to Bougie and Deliciousness on MTV, and Send Foodz on Thrillist. His career started on YouTube, where he uploaded comedic videos and original music.

== Early life ==
Chantarangsu was born in Billings, Montana, to parents of Thai heritage. He was raised in Long Beach, California, until the age of nine before moving to Paramount, California, where his parents opened the Thai Smile restaurant. He attended Paramount High School and went on to attend California State University, Long Beach but dropped out to pursue an entertainment career.

In 2009, Chantarangsu was fired from his job at a California Pizza Kitchen in Long Beach for tweeting that their new uniforms were "lame". As a child, he developed a business plan modeled after Will Smith, which he called the "Fresh Prince Format"; the plan outlined three career objectives: get a record deal, a television show, and a movie deal.

== Career ==
=== YouTube ===
His former stage name, Timothy DeLaGhetto, was inspired by an episode of The Fresh Prince of Bel-Air.

Chantarangsu's main YouTube channel had over 4.2 million subscribers and over 926 million video views as of October 14, 2025. It features original skits, parodies, rants, and a series called Dear DeLaGhetto.

As of March 31, 2024, Chantarangsu had produced over 1,100 vlogs, and has garnered approximately 1.26 million subscribers and over 240 million video views on his vlog channel. The channel consists of collaborations with other musical artists, songs from his albums and mixtapes, and a series called Weekly 16's. In 2017, he retired his rap alias "Traphik".

His style channel, also known as The Bakery, has over 234,000 subscribers and over 16 million video views. The channel is composed of his fit-of-the-day videos, clothing collections and style videos and interviews with fellow sneaker fans called "Kickin' It". One of his video ventures includes an animated web series named Powerhouse in which he plays himself.

In 2012, Chantarangsu released an EP titled Cruise Control. In 2014, Chantarangsu's YouTube Channel was listed on New Media Rockstars Top 100 Channels, ranked at #64.

Chantarangsu has participated in two episodes of Epic Rap Battles of History, as Kim Jong-Il in Season 1 in 2011 and as Sun Tzu in Season 4 in 2015.

Chantarangsu began regularly uploading his dating and relationship podcast, No Chaser, onto his main YouTube channel and other podcasting platforms in February 2019. His regular co-hosts include 97.7 KWIN host Nikki Blades and YouTuber Ricky Shucks.

He co-hosts the food show Send Foodz with fellow YouTuber David So. The show was picked up by Thrillist shortly after its initial debut on Chantarangsu's channel and airs every other Thursday.

In April 2020, Chantarangsu announced that he was retiring the "Timothy DeLaGhetto" moniker and would begin using his birth name professionally.

=== Film and television ===
In 2014, Chantarangsu appeared in the sci-fi film Isa, which first premiered on Syfy. The following year, he joined the fifth season of MTV's Guy Code. He later signed with talent agency CAA.

In 2016, it was announced that Chantarangsu was set to host a travel and food digital series titled Underbelly, in collaboration with the digital media company Astronauts Wanted, however it was never released. He was a cast member on the first season of the YouTube Red competition series Escape The Night. Chantarangsu also had appearances in the creator-led comedy films Dirty 30 and Laid in America. He made a guest appearance in the ABC digital series This Isn’t Working. He starred in the digital comedy series Thai Machine by The Station by Maker. He also appeared in the YouTube Red and Blumhouse horror-comedy series 12 Deadly Days.

Chantarangsu hosted the Fullscreen talk show Goin Raw with Timothy DeLaGhetto in 2017. In 2019, he starred in the fourth season of Escape the Night. He appeared in the drama film South Central Love. He later voiced a character in an episode of the Cartoon Network animated series Apple & Onion. Chantarangsu appeared in the 2020 comedy film Guest House.

In 2022, Chantarangsu had a recurring role in the second season of the Starz comedy-drama series Blindspotting. He has a supporting role in the Martin spinoff The Varnell Hill Show for Paramount+. He currently hosts the travel show Open House Outrageous, which airs on local NBC stations.

== Discography ==
=== Albums ===
- Rush Hour (2009)

=== Mixtapes ===
- The First Mixtape (2006)
- Will Rap for Food (2007)
- MixedApe (2010)
- Cruise Control (2012)
- No Jokes (2014)

=== Soundtrack ===
- High School Sucks: The Musical Soundtrack – 2011

=== Singles ===
- "Charlie Sheen" (with Jin and Dumbfoundead)
- "Chillin Here in the Atmosphere"
- "Magnetic" (with Tori Kelly)
- "Airplanes & Terminals" (with Andrew Garcia and G Seven)
- "Pillow Pet"

=== Featured artist ===
- "Shut It Down" (with Chris Miles)
- "My Fresh" (with Joanlee)
- "Pajama Pants" (with Nick Cannon, Migos, and Future)

== Filmography ==
Films
Year	Film	Role	Notes
2006	Thai Smile	Tim	Main Role
2006	The Fast and The Furious: Tokyo Drift	Himself	Cameo
2014	Isa	Big Boy	
2015	The Pizza Joint	Thomas	Main Role
2016	Bad Rap	Himself	Interviewee
2016	The Perfect Match	Himself	
2016	Laid in America	MC	
2020	Guest House	Thadius Baker	
2025	High School Sucks: The Musical	Ayo	
Television
Year	Program	Role	Notes
2011	The Timothy DeLaGhetto Show	Himself	Host
2013–2018, 2020–2021	Wild 'n Out	Himself	Cast member
2014	Love That Girl!		
2014	Retail		Co Star
2014	Million Dollar Maze Runner	Himself	Host
2015	Guy Code	Himself	
2019	Apple & Onion	Lil' Noodle	
2020–2022	Deliciousness	Himself	Co-panelist with Angela Kinsey and Kel Mitchell
2023	Blindspotting	Freddy	
2023	Discontinued	Himself	
2026	The Varnell Hill Show	George	
2026	Open House Outrageous	Himself	Host
Web
Year	Program	Role	Notes
2011-2012	Powerhouse	Tim	Main role
2012	Awkward Black Girl	Waiter	Episode: "The Waiter"
2016	Escape the Night Season 1	The Mobster	Main role; YouTube Originals series: 8 episodes
2016	Thai Machine	Himself	Main role
2017	Goin Raw with Timothy DeLaGhetto	Himself	Main role; Fullscreen Original series
2014–present	JustKiddingNews	Himself	Main role; Web series: various episodes
2018–present	Basic to Bougie	Himself	Main role; Co-host with Darren Brand
2018–2021	Send Foodz	Himself	Main role; Co-host with David So
2019	Escape the Night Season 4	The Con Man	Main role; YouTube Originals series: 3 episodes

== Additional reading ==
- 2018 - Interview with Delaghetto about the "Adpocalypse" Heard Well
