= Joey Graceffa =

American YouTuber (born 1991)

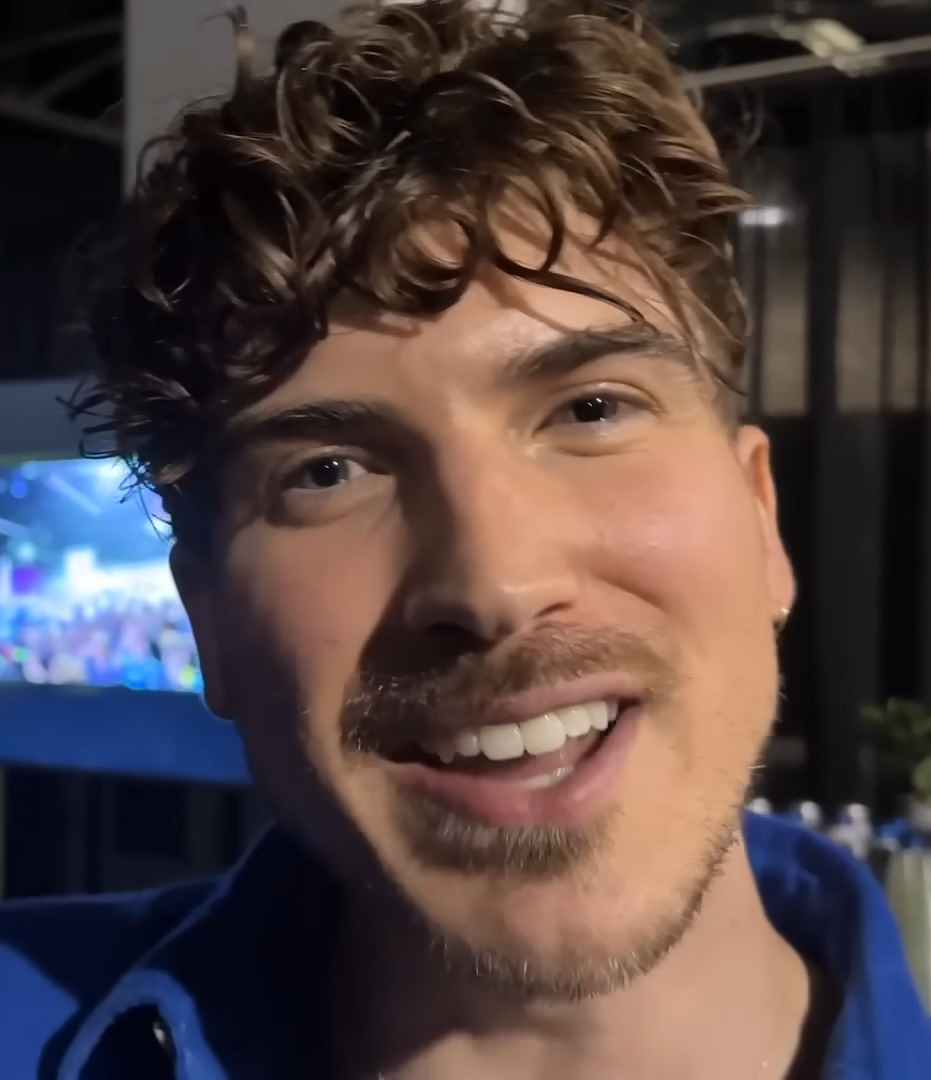
- Graceffa in 2025
- Born: Joseph Michael Graceffa Jr. May 16, 1991 (age 35); Marlborough, Massachusetts, U.S.
- Occupations: YouTuber; actor; author; producer

YouTube information
- Channels: Joey Graceffa; Joey Graceffa Games
- Years active: 2007–present
- Genres: Vlogging; gaming; how-to; DIY
- Subscribers: 9.38 million (main); 2.74 million (gaming)
- Views: 2.1 billion (main); 725.7 million (gaming)
- Last updated: October 27, 2026

Joseph Michael Graceffa Jr. (/ɡrəˈsɛfə/; born May 16, 1991) is an American YouTuber, vlogger, actor, author, and producer. He runs four active YouTube channels, all named after him. His main channel is dedicated to vlogging, while the second features video gaming content. The third is for daily vlogs, and the fourth is a react channel. His channels have a combined total of more than 2.9 billion views. He was a contestant on the 22nd and 24th seasons of The Amazing Race, and has appeared in a handful of short films as well as creating and hosting Escape the Night, an immersive reality web series, distributed by YouTube via its paid-subscription service YouTube Premium. He appears in all four of the seasons with several other YouTubers, including Liza Koshy, Tyler Oakley, Justine Ezarik, Lele Pons, Matthew Patrick, and Rosanna Pansino.

== Early life and education ==
Joseph Michael Graceffa Jr. was born on May 16, 1991, in Marlborough, Massachusetts. He is the son of Debbie O'Connor, who is Irish-American, and Joseph Graceffa Sr, who is Italian-American. He has two siblings, an older sister, Nicole, and a younger half-brother, Jett, who has autism, through his mother and his stepfather, Bob. When Graceffa was around 12 years old, his mother became an alcoholic. According to his book In Real Life, he graduated from Marlborough High School in 2009. He had originally applied to Emerson College but was rejected. Graceffa enrolled at Fitchburg State College intending to major in film but left after one year.

== Career ==
=== 2007–2013: YouTube and The Amazing Race ===
In 2007, at age 16, Graceffa began uploading videos to the WinterSpringPro YouTube channel, with his high school friend Brittany Joyal. In 2009, he started posting videos on his own channel, called, Joey Graceffa. In 2013, he joined the StyleHaul YouTube network. Graceffa posts regular vlogs on his channel. As of April 2022, he has gained over 9.4 million subscribers and more than 2.1 billion total views on his main YouTube channel alone. On a second YouTube channel focusing on his gaming, he has more than 2.6 million subscribers and over 620 million views, for a total of over 2.6 billion views. He also has more than 3.9 million Twitter followers and more than 5.5 million Instagram followers.

In 2013, Graceffa and fellow YouTube personality Meghan Camarena were contestants on The Amazing Race 22. The two made it to the tenth leg before being eliminated. Graceffa told an interviewer that "There were a lot of bad times but it was definitely good overall. It was an amazing experience, and I'd love to do it again." The two later teamed up again to compete in The Amazing Race: All-Stars.

In October 2013, Graceffa filmed a video about his car being towed. Comedian Nate Clark filmed a response video that was viewed more than 4 million times.

=== 2013–2015: Films, In Real Life and other projects ===
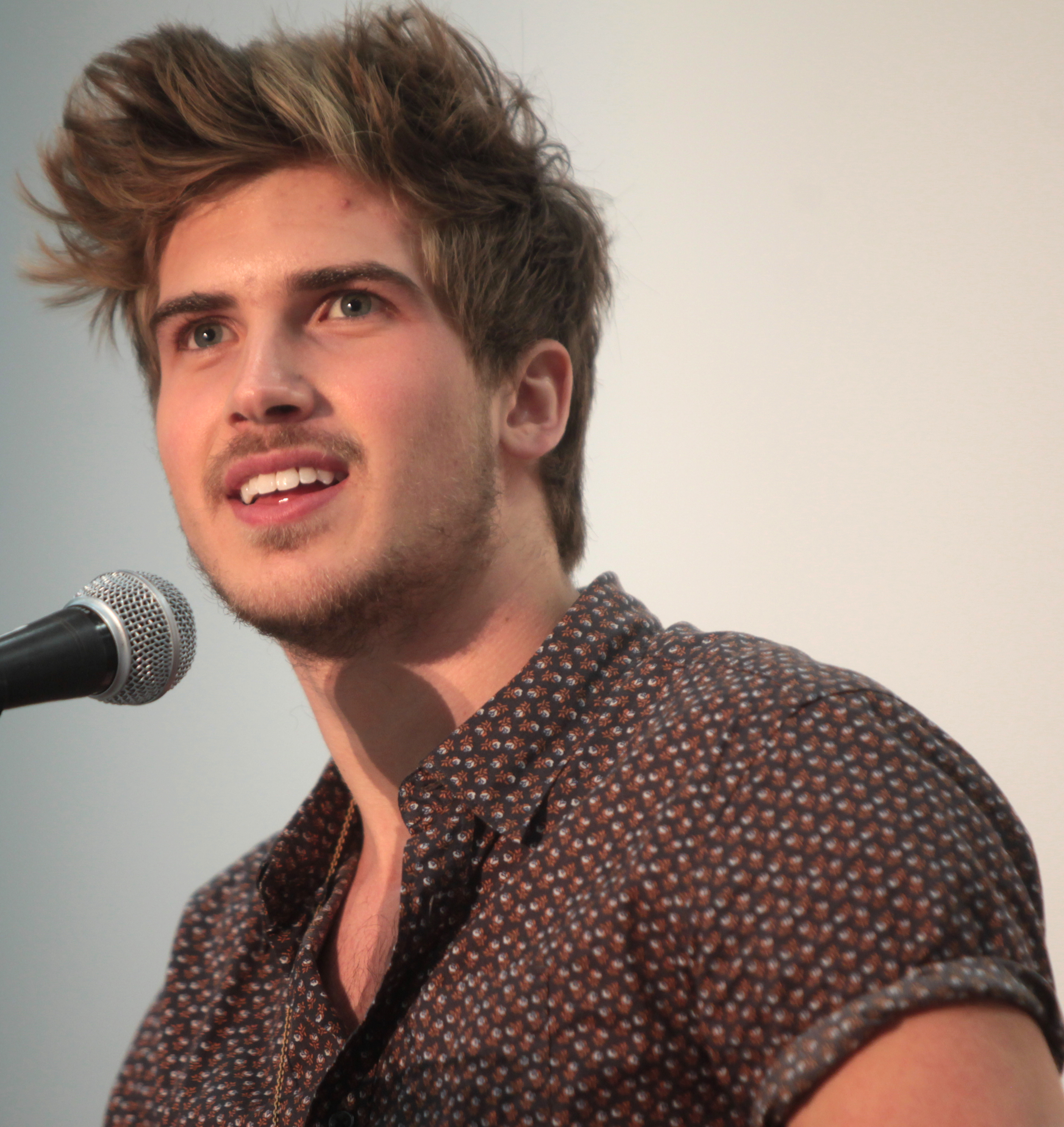
Graceffa at Vidcon in 2014

In late 2013 and early 2014, Graceffa starred in his own web series titled Storytellers. The project was funded by Kickstarter and Indiegogo campaigns that Graceffa ran himself. They raised over $140,000 and $30,000, respectively, though reports continue into 2018 that some of the project backers have not received their perks or rewards for backing the project.

In 2014, Graceffa starred in his own short film titled Eon. The same year, Graceffa also starred in Ethereal alongside Joey Pollari. From 2012 to 2014, Graceffa was in various BlackBoxTV short films. He was also a part of the Fine Brothers online series MyMusic throughout 2013 and 2014. Graceffa was nominated for two awards at the 2014 Teen Choice Awards. He won "Best Male Actor in a Dramatic Web Series" at the 2014 Streamy Awards for his portrayal of Hunter Crowley in Storytellers. Graceffa was named by Common Sense Media as one of "10 YouTube Stars Your Kids Love".

In March 2015, Graceffa starred in an episode of the CONtv reality television project Fight of the Living Dead, created by fellow YouTube personality Justine Ezarik.

On May 16, 2015, Graceffa released a song with an accompanying music video titled "Don't Wait". It is an unconventional fantasy fairytale story featuring goblins, a witch, and a prince. The video ends with Graceffa, dressed as a prince, kissing his male co-star, Daniel Preda. By October 2016, it had received more than 24 million views. Graceffa confirmed on YouTube on May 18, 2015, that he is gay. Graceffa stated that the reason he waited so long to come out online was because "there was a lot of hesitation to come out online because of growing up in my town: It wasn't acceptable to be gay; it was looked down upon." He also went on to state that after coming out, "I definitely feel more open and free with who I am, and I think that's inspired a lot of other people to also do the same and have come out to their friends and family."

On May 19, 2015, Graceffa released a memoir titled In Real Life: My Journey to a Pixelated World, published by Keywords Press. In the book, he discusses being bullied and feeling lonely in school, his mother's alcoholism, his younger brother's autism, the beginnings of his YouTube career and his road to self-acceptance, among other topics. His book was a New York Times Best Seller on the "celebrities" list in July 2015 and the cover was updated to acknowledge this achievement.

=== 2016–present: Escape the Night, books, and other endeavors ===
On February 14, 2016, Graceffa announced that he has been in a relationship with Daniel Preda since July 2014 in a video titled "OUR LOVE STORY!".

On June 21, 2016, Graceffa announced in his YouTube video, titled "I HAVE A SURPRISE!", that he's starting a crystal-based jewelry line called "Crystal Wolf". On June 7, 2017, Crystal Wolf Co released their Summer Solstice Collection with new jewelry and including the Crystal nail polish for the overall Summer Collection.

On June 22, 2016, Graceffa started, starred, and uploaded the first episode of a YouTube Premium mini-web series called Escape the Night with other YouTubers like Shane Dawson, Eva Gutowski, Glozell Green, Oli White, Timothy DeLaGhetto, Andrea Brooks, Matthew Haag, Justine Ezarik, Sierra Furtado, and one Viner/YouTuber, Lele Pons. The first episode has over 24,000,000 views. On June 22, 2017, Graceffa started, starred, and uploaded the first episode his YouTube Premium web series Escape the Night's season 2. The season stars himself and includes Liza Koshy, Alex Wassabi, Lauren Riihimaki, DeStorm Power, Gabbie Hanna, Jesse Wellens, Andrea Russett, Tyler Oakley, and Tana Mongeau. On June 21, 2018, Graceffa released the first episode of the third series of Escape The Night, starring Graceffa, Nikita Dragun, Teala Dunn, Safiya Nygaard, Manny MUA, Guava Juice, Rosanna Pansino, JC Caylen, Matthew Patrick, and Colleen Ballinger. On July 11, 2019, Graceffa released the first episode of the fourth season of Escape The Night, starring Graceffa, Rosanna Pansino, Alex Wassabi, Timothy DeLaGhetto, DeStorm Power, Justine Ezarik, Tana Mongeau, Colleen Ballinger, Gabbie Hanna, Bretman Rock, Nikita Dragun, Matthew Patrick, and Liza Koshy.

On October 4, 2016, Graceffa, along with co-author Laura L. Sullivan, released a young adult novel titled Children of Eden, published by Keywords Press. The book follows a Second child named Rowen, who is marked with death due to Eden's population control and recklessly escapes for an adventure after sixteen years of hiding. His book was a New York Times Best Seller on the "Young Adult Hardcover" list in the week of October 23, 2016. Critics have not been universally positive, although Rachel Hyland of Geek Speak Magazine wrote, "Graceffa knows a lot about YA dystopian conventions, and they are all present and accounted for here. This is by no means a bad thing — an enjoyable romp through this genre doesn't necessarily require too much divergence (no pun intended) from the established norms — but it is worth noting that most everything in his Eden has pretty much happened before, in one way or another. Still, it is fun to see just how those ever-trusty elements are put together, and there is a nice twist on the almost essential love triangle that is actually pretty awesome."

On January 6, 2017, Graceffa announced that he would be playing an extra in the full-length feature film, The Space Between Us. The movie originally released in the United States on February 3, 2017, follows a teenage boy (Asa Butterfield), born on Mars, who travels to Earth. After uniting with his long-distant friend (Britt Robertson), the duo soon form a new relationship with each other.

On May 16, 2017, Graceffa announced in his YouTube video, titled "MOST INSANE BIRTHDAY SURPRISE EVER!" the sequel to his young adult novel Children of Eden. The sequel, entitled, Elites of Eden, follows an Elite and a lilac-haired girl – Yarrow and Lark. When these two girls discover the thread that binds them together, the collision of memories means that their lives may change drastically – and that Eden may never be the same. Rowan - captured by the government, her fate is uncertain.

In a YouTube video uploaded on May 16, 2018, Graceffa's 27th birthday, he announced the release of the final book in his "Children of Eden" series, Rebels of Eden. It went on sale on October 2, 2018.

In a YouTube video uploaded to Graceffa's main channel on July 12, 2020, Graceffa and Preda announced that they had split after six years of dating.

== Personal life ==
Graceffa is gay and was in a relationship with Daniel Preda from 2014 to 2020.

On August 8, 2024, Graceffa announced he had been diagnosed with skin cancer.

== Filmography ==
=== Film ===
| Year | Title | Role | Notes |
|---|---|---|---|
| 2014 | Eon | Drifter | Short film; also served as producer |
| 2014 | Ethereal | Zane | Short film; also served as executive producer |
| 2014 | Haunting Ian | Ian | Short film; also served as writer and executive producer |
| 2014 | Storytellers | Hunter | TV mini series; also served as writer and executive producer |
| 2016 | Absolute Peril | Jake | Short film |
| 2016 | Children of Eden | Ash | Short film; also served as writer and producer. |
| 2017 | The Space Between Us | Student | |

=== Television ===
| Year | Title | Role | Notes |
|---|---|---|---|
| 2015 | Huge on the Tube | Himself | Episode: "Joey Graceffa" |
| 2015 | Influencer Journeys | Himself | |
| 2013–2014 | The Amazing Race | Himself | Season 22 (11 episodes), Season 24 (4 episodes) |
| 2025 | Escape the Night: The Lost Tapes | The Savant: as well as director and showrunner | Miniseries on Tubi: continuation and conclusion of original webseries |

=== Web ===
| Year | Title | Role | Notes |
|---|---|---|---|
| 2012–2014 | BlackBoxTV | Various | 4 episodes |
| 2013–2014 | MyMusic | Vampire Temp | Recurring role; 6 episodes |
| 2013 | Storytellers | Hunter Crowley | Main role; 6 episodes Also executive producer, writer, and co-creator |
| 2015 | Fight of the Living Dead | Himself | Episode: "Pilot" |
| 2016 | Children of Eden | Ash | Short film; also served as writer and producer |
| 2016–2019 | Escape the Night | The Savant/Himself | Host; YouTube Premium series |
| 2017 | Haters Back Off | Himself | Episode: "my 1rst bae" |
| 2018 | Spellslingers | Himself | Episode: "Day[9] vs. Joey Graceffa" |

== Discography ==
=== Extended plays ===
- Panem's Best (2012)
- Good Songs (2014)
- Cheese Is Creamy (2015)
- Kingdom (2019)

=== Singles ===
| Title | Year | Peak chart positions | | Album | Ref. |
| Title | Year | UK D/L | UK Indie | Album | Ref. |
|---|---|---|---|---|---|
| "We Are Never Ever Getting Back Together" (solo or duet with Luke Conard) | 2012 | — | — | Non-album singles | |
| "Kiss You" (solo or duet with Luke Conard) | 2013 | — | — | Non-album singles | |
| "Anna Sun" | 2013 | — | — | Non-album singles | |
| "Story of My Life" (with Luke Conard) | 2013 | — | — | Non-album singles | |
| "Collar Full" | 2014 | — | — | Non-album singles | |
| "Silver Lining" | 2014 | — | — | Non-album singles | |
| "Don't Wait" | 2015 | 64 | 7 | Non-album singles | |
| "Kingdom" | 2018 | — | — | Kingdom | |
"—" denotes a recording that failed to chart or was not released to that country.

== Bibliography ==
- In Real Life: My Journey to a Pixelated World (2015)
- Children of Eden (2016)
- Elites of Eden (2017)
- Rebels of Eden (2018)

== Awards and nominations ==
| Year | Nominated | Award | Result |
|---|---|---|---|
| 2014 | Teen Choice Awards | Teen Choice Award for Choice Web Star: Male | Nominated |
| 2014 | Teen Choice Awards | Teen Choice Award for Choice Web Star: Gaming | Nominated |
| 2014 | Streamy Awards | Best Male Actor in a Dramatic Web Series – Storytellers | Won |
| 2014 | Streamy Awards | Best Drama Series - Storytellers | Nominated |
| 2015 | Teen Choice Awards | Teen Choice Award for Choice Web Star: Male | Nominated |
| 2015 | Streamy Awards | Best Lifestyle Series | Nominated |
| 2016 | Teen Choice Awards | Teen Choice Award for Choice Web Star: Male | Nominated |
| 2016 | Streamy Awards | Best Ensemble Cast - Escape The Night | Won |
| 2017 | Shorty Awards | Best Web Series - Escape The Night | Nominated |
