= Eva Gutowski =

American YouTuber

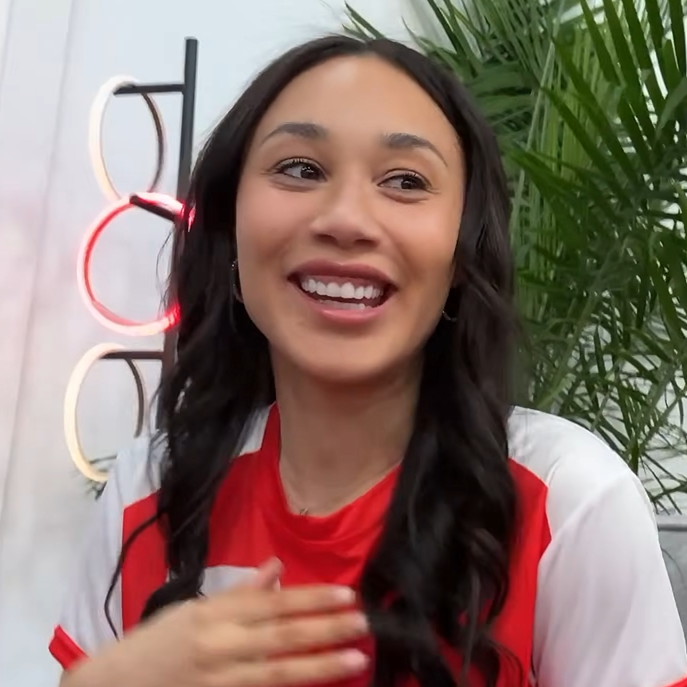
- Gutowski in 2026
- Born: Eva Marisol Gutowski; July 29, 1994 (age 32); Brea, California, U.S.
- Occupations: Actress; DJ

YouTube information
- Channel: MyLifeAsEva
- Years active: 2011–present
- Genres: Beauty; fashion; comedy; lifestyle
- Subscribers: 11 million
- Views: 1.55 billion
- Last updated: April 8, 2026

Eva Marisol Gutowski (born July 29, 1994), also known as MyLifeasEva, is an American YouTube influencer and actress with 11.1 million subscribers on YouTube. She graduated from Brea Olinda High School in Brea, California. She also attended California State University at Fullerton. She was ranked #4 in Variety's Famechangers Digital Star Ranking list. People termed her YouTube's fastest growing star. She has also been included in Billboard's Social Media Stars list.

In mid 2016, she played herself but was titled as "The Journalist" in the first season of Escape the Night in a main role and returned briefly in the second season's pilot episode. She is the author of a lifestyle and advice book titled My Life as Eva: The Struggle is Real where she reveals her past issues with mental health. She also starred in a YouTube Red web series called Me and My Grandma that premiered on Gutowski's YouTube channel on March 22, 2017. Since Eva's YouTube and acting career, she began producing electronic music. Her music "takes on provoking, dark and nostalgic moods", although her love for music started during her early teens.

In August 2017, MTV announced that Gutowski would join the revamped Total Request Live as part of a rotating social media correspondent position alongside fellow YouTubers, Gabbie Hanna, and Gigi Gorgeous.

In 2019, she appeared in a PETA ad, protesting marine parks that keep mammals and other animals imprisoned in tanks.

In 2020, she appeared in the "We the People" segment in the 2020 Democratic National Convention with her father.

== Personal life ==
Gutowski is of Dominican Republic, German, Irish, Polish, and Puerto Rican descent.

Gutowski is vegan and says she likes to do her own cooking because, "I know whatever I put into what I cook is healthy."

In September 2016, Gutowski came out as bisexual and to her fans on her Twitter platform. She went on to say, "I am ready for myself to fall in love with someone, no matter who they end up being, and have been since I was 12. Boy or girl."

In 2017 Eva released the YouTube video "Why I'm Breathing" under her alter YouTube account (vlogtowski) which is currently renamed to Marisol. In this video, she reflects upon her past struggles with depression and suicidal thoughts. She explained her connections to the show 13 Reasons Why. In this video she urges her fans to understand that their lives are worth living.

Eva opens up about more of her past struggles in her autobiography My Life is Eva: The Struggle is real. In this book and the YouTube video "I Am A Victim of Sexual Assault", Eva tells her story about being sexually assaulted in high school. In a Teen Vogue article, she acknowledges the impact sexual assault has had on her while telling her fans there isn't anything they can't overcome. Eva's main goal of telling her story was to advocate for and help those experiencing sexual abuse and making those who haven't understand the impact.

In August 2018, Gutowski announced on Twitter that her car got rear-ended by a woman texting while driving. Eva said she wasn't in the car, but the lady was sent to the hospital, and her car got fixed 3 months later.

Gutowski began dating her current partner, Olav Stubberud, in 2020. In 2026, Olav and Gutowski got engaged.

In 2021, Eva started releasing music under her middle name Marisol, debuting as a musician with the single "Hawaii".

In 2023, she moved to New York City with her boyfriend Olav.

== Filmography ==
List of Gutowski's screen appearances
Year	Show	Role	Notes
2015	How to Survive High School	Eva	Main role (6 episodes)
2016-17	Escape the Night	The Journalist	Main role (Season 1), Cameo (Season 2) (11 episodes)
2016	Bizaardvark	Herself	Episode: "Control (Plus) Alt (Plus) Escape!"
2017	Me and My Grandma	Janey Skalecki	Main role (6 episodes)
2018	All Night	Lyssee	Main role (10 episodes)
2019	How to Survive a Break-Up	Eva	Main role (6 episodes)
2019	VS Couples Ships	Eva	Episode: "Brent and Eva Expose Each Other" and "2 Truths and a Lie"
2020	Jamie Lynn Spears & Chantel Jeffries: Follow Me	Potential Lola #1	Main Role
2020	What's The Catch	Eva	Main Role

== Music career ==
Eva Gutowski has released a total of 8 songs under the name Marisol since her debut in 2021. In the past few years, she has amassed almost 21,000 monthly Spotify listeners with her first song "Hawaii" reaching over 2 million streams. Since this release Eva has commented on her "new sound". In a March 2025 interview Eva opens up about the struggles of producing techno music and developing your own sound. "When I first learned to produce, I was trying to throw every skill I had into every song I made…I think I was trying to prove to myself that I knew all these technical skills, but I wanted to grow out of that". Eva released her Debut Album "OUCH" on June 26th 2026.

Since 2021, Eva reflected upon her choice to become a Dj in an interview with the YouTube channel GAFFER. She responds to the question "What's the best part about being a Dj?" with "you get to look at everyone in the club, you see people falling in love or people beefing in the corner. You get to see everything and it's such a crazy look at the human experience".

Eva considers herself an independent artist. However, she revealed in the same interview that her Norwegian boyfriend, Olav, is the mastermind involved in the creation of her music videos and projects. Olav took Eva to a forest rave in Norway; she noted that the dark foggy scene is the main inspiration behind her music video "ON THE FLOOR".

== Bibliography ==
- My Life as Eva: The Struggle is Real
