= Don't Wait (Joey Graceffa song) =

Single by Joey Graceffa
- Released: May 12, 2015
- Genre: Pop rock
- Length: 3:25
- Label: Self-released
- Songwriters: Eric Leva, Brett McLaughlin, Matt Parad

Joey Graceffa singles chronology
"Silver Lining" (2014)	"Don't Wait" (2015)	"Kingdom" (2018)

Music video
- "Don't Wait" on YouTube

"Don't Wait" is a song recorded by American YouTube personality Joey Graceffa. Written by Eric Leva, Brett McLaughlin, Matt Parad, it is the third original composition released by Graceffa. It was released independently as a single on May 12, 2015.

== Chart performance ==
"Don't Wait" debuted at number 64 on the official UK Singles Downloads Chart, a component of the UK Singles Chart for the week of May 24, 2015, becoming his first charting single. It also entered the UK Independent Singles chart at number 7 and the UK Independent Singles Breakers component chart (Note: The UK Independent Singles Breakers chart ranks only the independently-released singles that have not yet entered the Top 20 on the UK Singles Chart.) at number 1.

== Music video ==
An accompanying music video for the song was directed by Doug Potts and was uploaded to Graceffa's YouTube channel on May 16, 2015. The video uses fantasy elements to dramatize the struggles Graceffa faced growing up, including goblins depicting bullies and a witch representing his alcoholic mother. Graceffa's character spends the video attempting to rescue a prince, played by blogger Daniel Preda, from a dark shadow version of himself. In the end, he succeeds, and the two share a kiss on a rocky edge near the river.

This kiss between Graceffa and Preda, who confirmed in February 2016 that they had been dating since before the video shoot, served as Graceffa's first public acknowledgement of his homosexuality. He formally came out two days later, in another video titled "Yes I'm Gay" and in his memoir, In Real Life: My Journey Through a Pixelated World, which was published May 19, 2015.

== Reception ==
Emma Lord of lifestyle blog Bustle described the video as "one of the most groundbreaking and adorable videos of the year." She praised the production for "depicting the very real struggles he faced growing up," and "[coming] to a satisfying end" with the kiss. Following the video's release, Graceffa received many supportive comments from fans and fellow "YouTubers." By April 2023, the video had been viewed over 42.7 million times.

== Track listing ==
No.	Title	Music	Length
1.	"Don't Wait"	Eric Leva, Brett McLaughlin, Matt Parad	3:25

== Charts ==
Chart (2015)	Peak position
Scottish Singles Chart (Official Charts Company)	59
UK Downloads Chart (Official Charts Company)	64
UK Indie Singles (Official Charts Company)	7
