= Guava Juice =

Filipino-American YouTuber (born 1991)

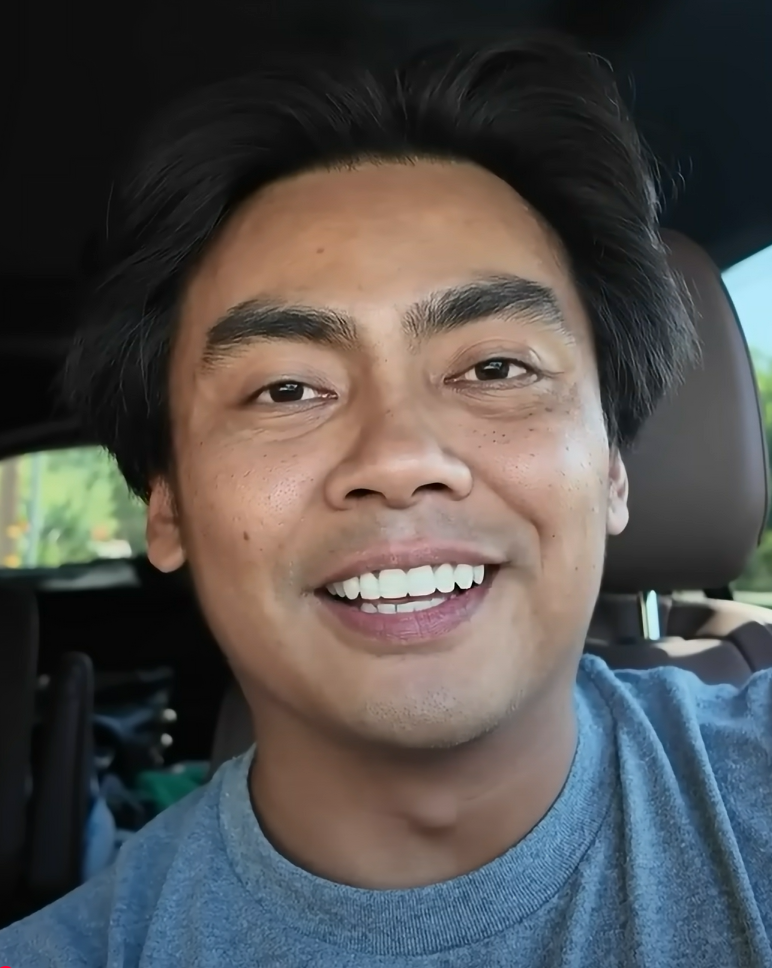
- Fabito in 2025
- Born: Roi Allan Gille Fabito; August 21, 1991 (age 35); Dagupan, Pangasinan, Philippines
- Education: North Carolina State University
- Spouse: Monette Solomon (m. 2023)
- Children: 1

YouTube information
- Channels: Guava Juice; Guava Juice Vlogs
- Years active: 2006–present
- Genre: Challenge
- Subscribers: 16.7 million (main channel); 3.11 million (Guava Juice Vlogs)
- Views: 9.52 billion (main channel); 707.28 million (Guava Juice Vlogs)
- Last updated: September 9, 2026
- Website: guavajuice.com

Roi Allan Gille Fabito (born August 21, 1991), better known as Guava Juice, is a Filipino-American YouTuber, actor and internet personality. He is known for his kid-friendly challenge videos, and formerly as half of the sketch-comedy duo Wassabi Productions with Alex Wassabi.

== Early life ==
Roi Allan Gille Fabito was born on August 21, 1991, in Dagupan, Pangasinan, Philippines to Allan Fabito and Grace Fabito (née Gille). He has two younger brothers, Reymound and Russell, and a younger sister, Ariel. He and his family moved to Durham, North Carolina, when he was two after his mom got a job there. He moved back to the Philippines when he was 8 while his parents became more stable in the United States and moved back when he was 10. Fabito worked as a delivery driver for an Asian fusion restaurant while at North Carolina State University studying computer engineering. He later changed his major to film after not wanting to pursue it anymore, moving to Los Angeles after he finished college.

== Career ==
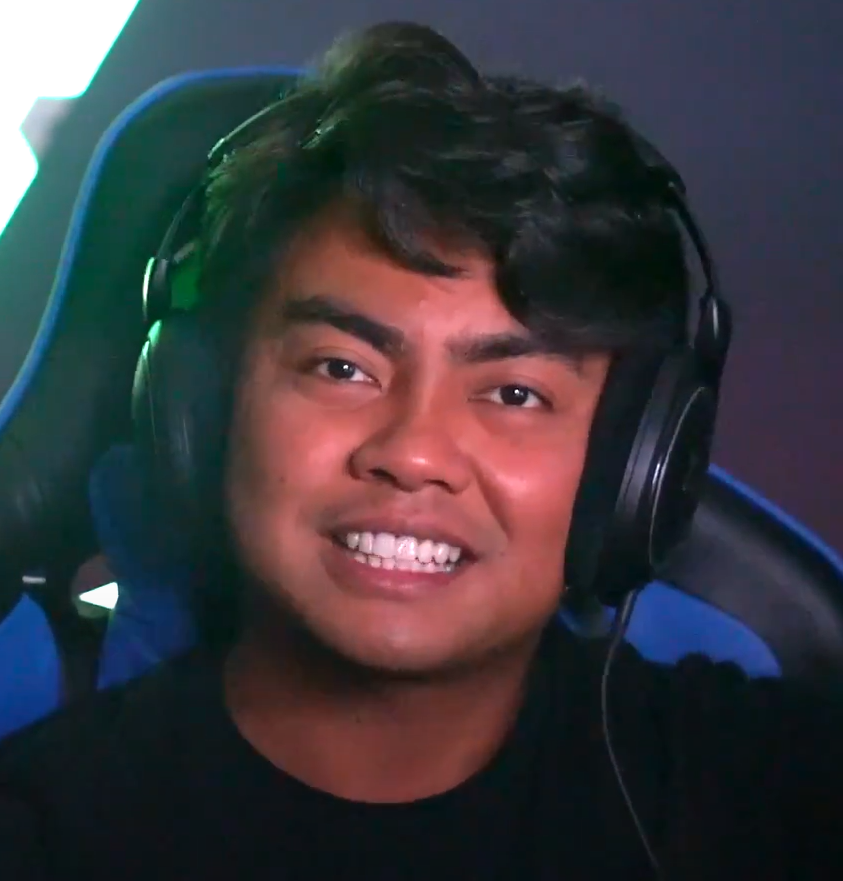
Fabito in 2018

Fabito created his channel in 2006, when he was in high school, and originally uploaded skits with his friends.

Fabito was formerly part of another channel, the duo Wassabi Productions, as Roi Wassabi, with Alex Wassabi. He began uploading on Guava Juice more frequently after leaving the channel in 2016.

In 2018, Fabito appeared in the third season of the reality television web series Escape the Night. He also started a toy brand, Guava Toys, in that same year; products sold by the brand include DIY slime kits, bath bombs, and pancake art creators. Fabito also released a mobile game, Tub Tapper, and a studio album, Stay Juicy.

In 2022, Fabito starred in the animated comedy children's series The Guava Juice Show produced by Mainframe Studios, with additional voice acting by Bethany Brown and Adrian Petriw. He also released a line of non-fungible tokens. Fabito signed to FilmRise's Creator Partner Program in 2024.

== Personal life ==
Fabito married Monette Solomon in 2023 and the couple announced their first child, a girl, in 2026.

== Awards and nominations ==
Year	Award	Category	Result	Ref.
2019	Kids' Choice Awards	Favorite Social Star	Nominated	
2019	Shorty Awards	YouTuber of the Year	Nominated	
2017	Streamy Awards	Kids and Family	Nominated	
2018	Streamy Awards	Kids and Family	Won	
2019	Streamy Awards	Kids and Family	Nominated	
2019	Teen Choice Awards	Choice Male Web Star	Nominated	

== Discography ==
=== Albums ===
Title	Album details
Stay Juicy	Released: January 13, 2018; Label: Vsop Records

=== Singles ===
Title	Year
"I Love Fidget Spinners"	2017
"Driving in My Whip"	2017
"Hit 'em With the Onomatopoeia"	2017
"Stay Juicy"	2018
"Hit the Tub Tap"	2018
"Wash Your Hands"	2020
"I'm Not the Imposter"	2020
"Im Trash"	2021
"To the Tub (From "The Guava Juice Show")"	2022
"I Love Fidget Spinners (Deluxe Version)"	2022
"I Love Fidget Spinners (Sped up Version)"	2024
