= Escape the Night season 4 =

Fourth season of Escape the Night

Escape the Night
- Season 4
- Promotional poster for season four.
- No. of contestants: 10
- Winners: Bretman Rock; Colleen Ballinger
- No. of episodes: 10

Release
- Original network: YouTube Premium
- Original release: July 11 – September 4, 2019

Season chronology
- ← Previous; Season 3 Next → The Lost Tapes

The fourth season of Escape the Night, subtitled All Stars, premiered on July 11, 2019, through YouTube Premium, and concluded on September 4, 2019, after 10 episodes. Haunted by the deaths his adventures have caused, Joey Graceffa's Savant allies with the Society Against Evil to open a gateway into purgatory and enter the Museum of the Dead, where the souls of his fallen friends are held as exhibits by its ruler, the Collector. Eight guests from the first three seasons are freed to fight for a second life, alongside newcomer Bretman Rock, with each guest assuming a 1940s-styled persona.

Two guests — Bretman Rock and Colleen Ballinger — escaped the museum, while Graceffa's fate was left unknown after he stayed behind and vanished into Pandora's Box, setting up the events of Escape the Night: The Lost Tapes.

== Format ==
The season is set inside the Museum of the Dead, a purgatorial museum whose exhibits imprison the souls and monsters the Collector has gathered from different eras — including the guests who died in the series' first three seasons. After Joey breaches the museum and frees eight of his friends, the group learns that an Armageddon clock is counting down to morning, when everyone outside their exhibit will be burned to ash. To escape, the guests must survive the museum's exhibits, each a different era brought lethally to life, and recover the nine jeweled keys to the vault that holds their way out.

Each episode centers on one exhibit and its antagonist. After a recap narrated by the Collector and a scripted flashback introducing the exhibit, the guests work through that exhibit's story and puzzles, then typically vote two of their own into a lethal challenge, with the loser dying — again — and a key being claimed. Votes are cast with cards bearing each guest's name, which an in-story character shuffles and draws from; mistakes in some tasks, or drinking from cursed chalices, place a guest's card directly in the voting pile. The season varies its mechanics heavily: one episode replaces the vote with a coin-collecting game in which the two poorest guests are forced into the challenge, one challenge offers both competitors the chance to survive, Joey volunteers into one challenge in another guest's place, one challenge spares both competitors, and one is a three-way test. Two devices return dead guests to the game: a guardian angel stone brings back Matthew Patrick and Nikita Dragun as temporary helpers, and a genie's wish restores Colleen Ballinger permanently.

The storyline was scripted and performed with actors, while most votes and challenge outcomes were decided in play. Graceffa has said that the fifth episode's double elimination was arranged in advance by production.

== Guests ==
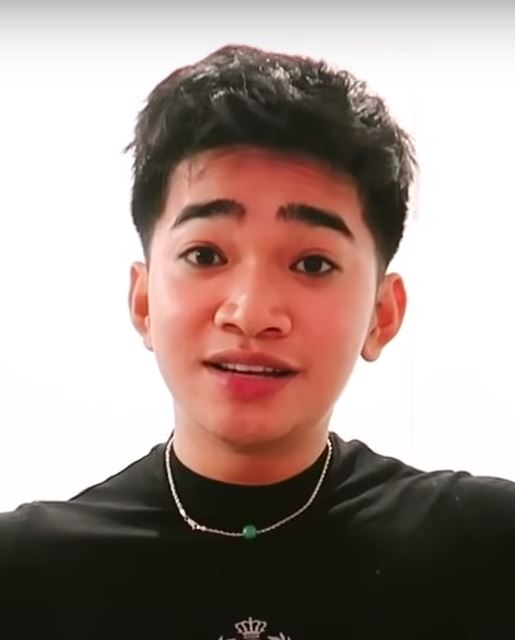
Bretman Rock

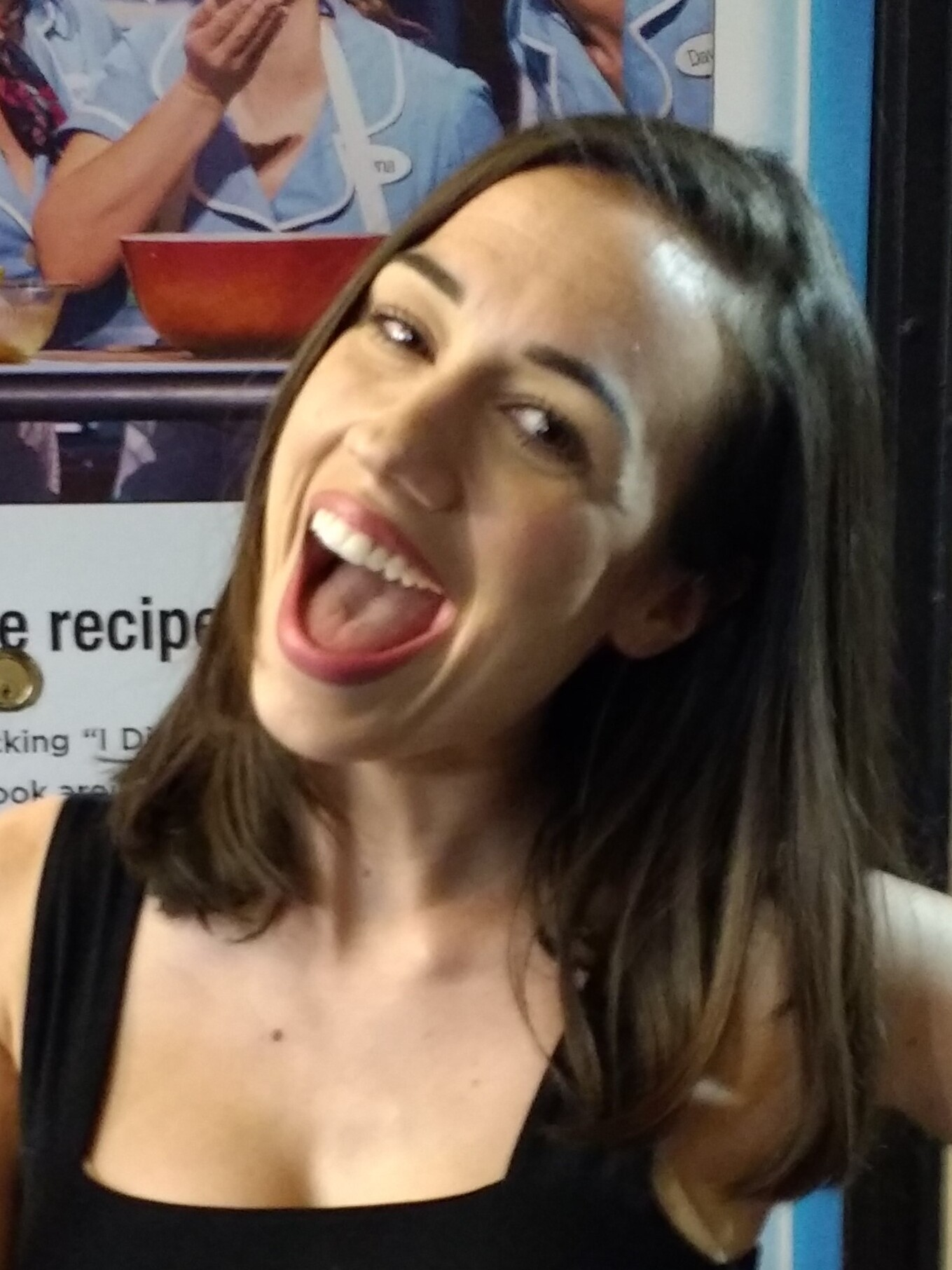
Colleen Ballinger

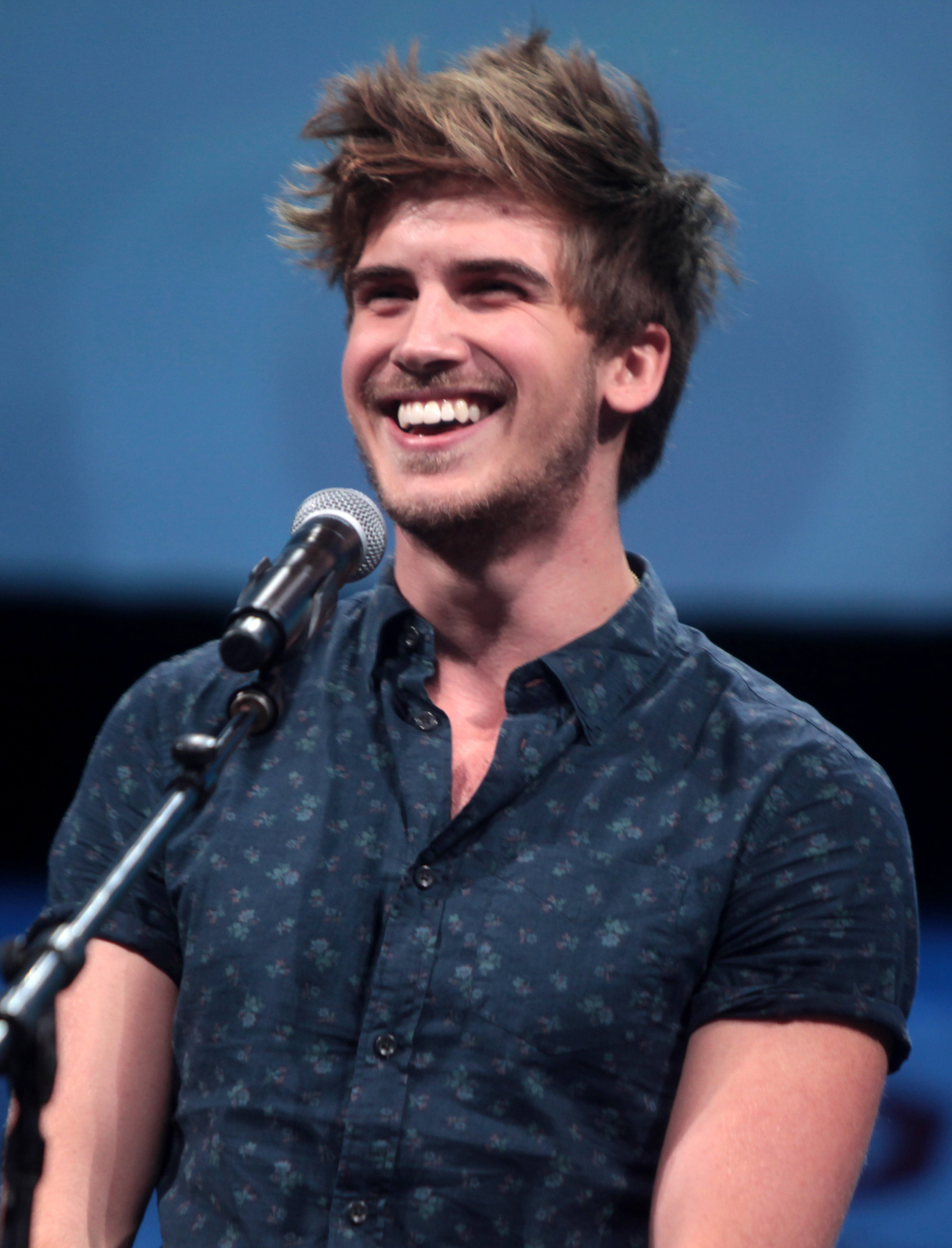
Joey Graceffa

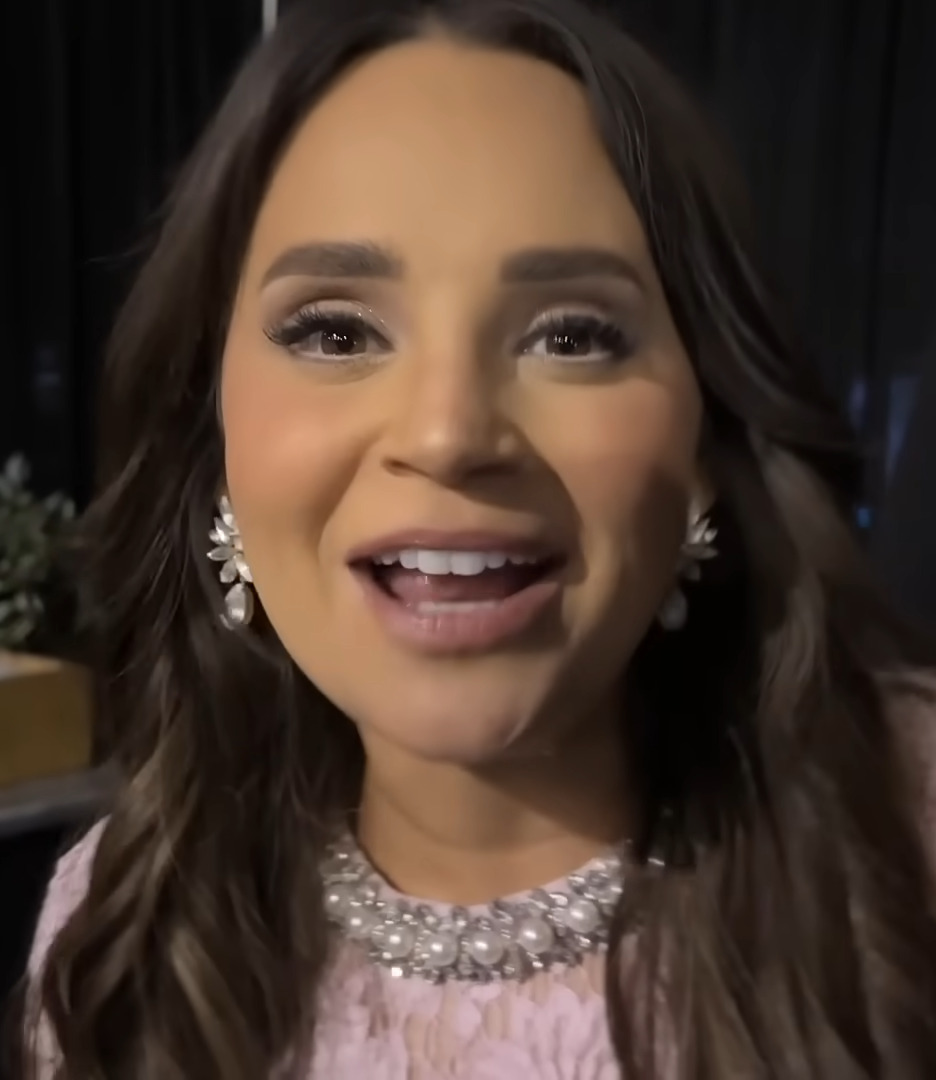
Rosanna Pansino

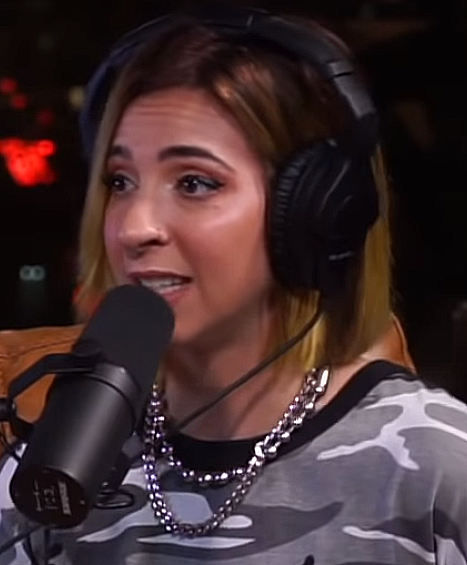
Gabbie Hanna

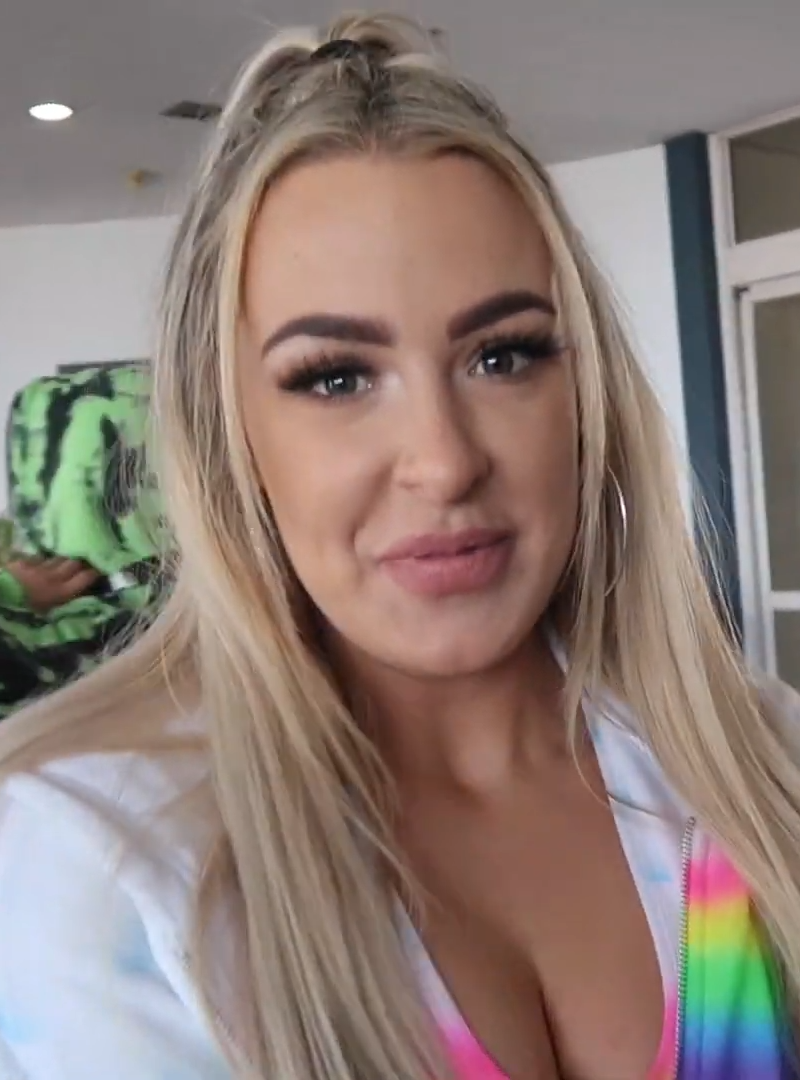
Tana Mongeau

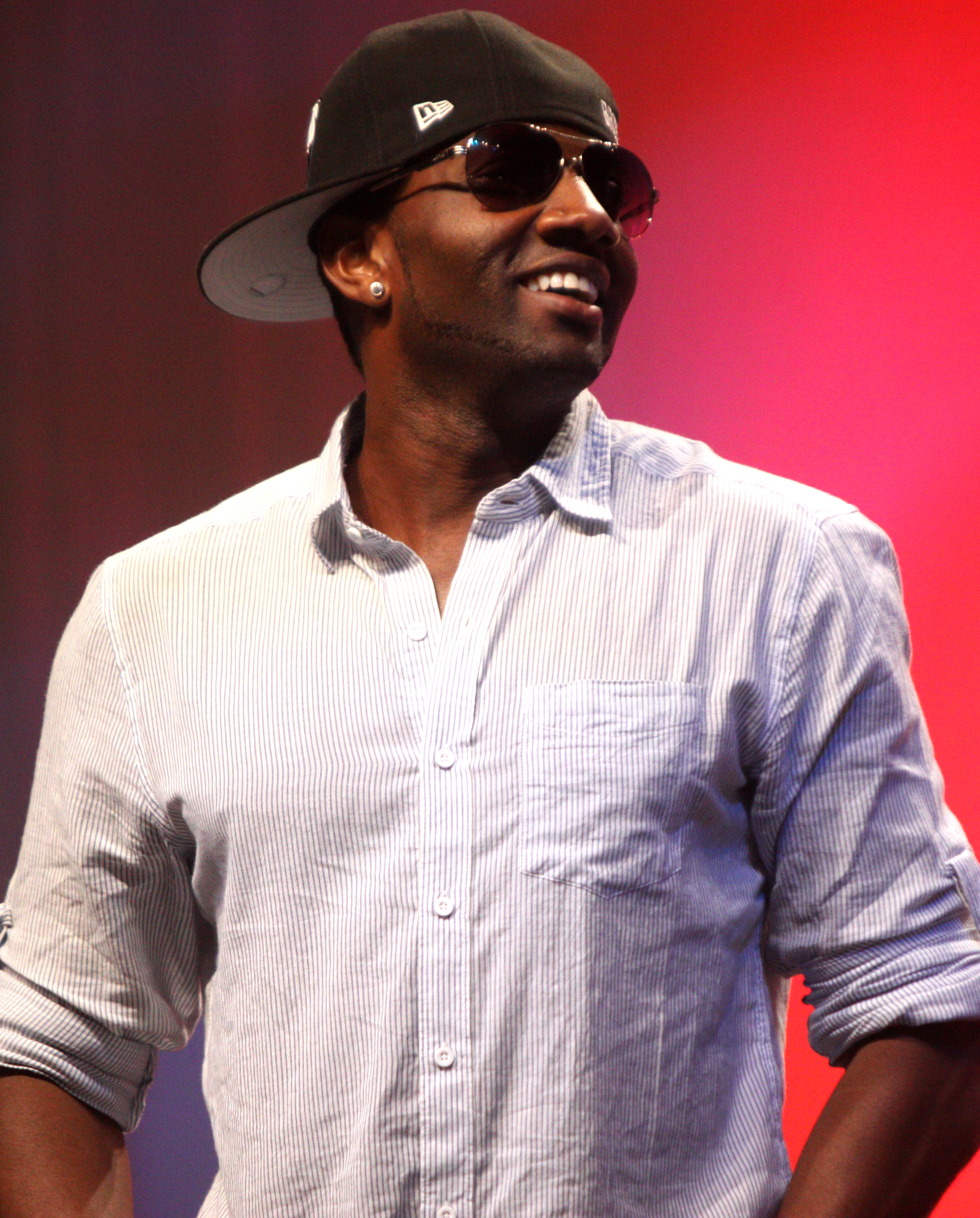
DeStorm Power

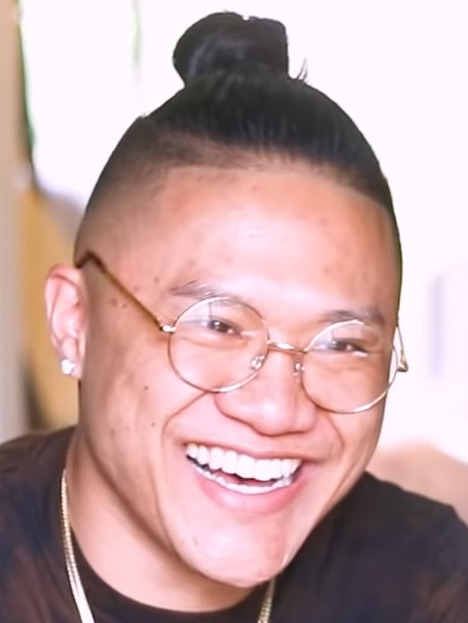
Timothy DeLaGhetto

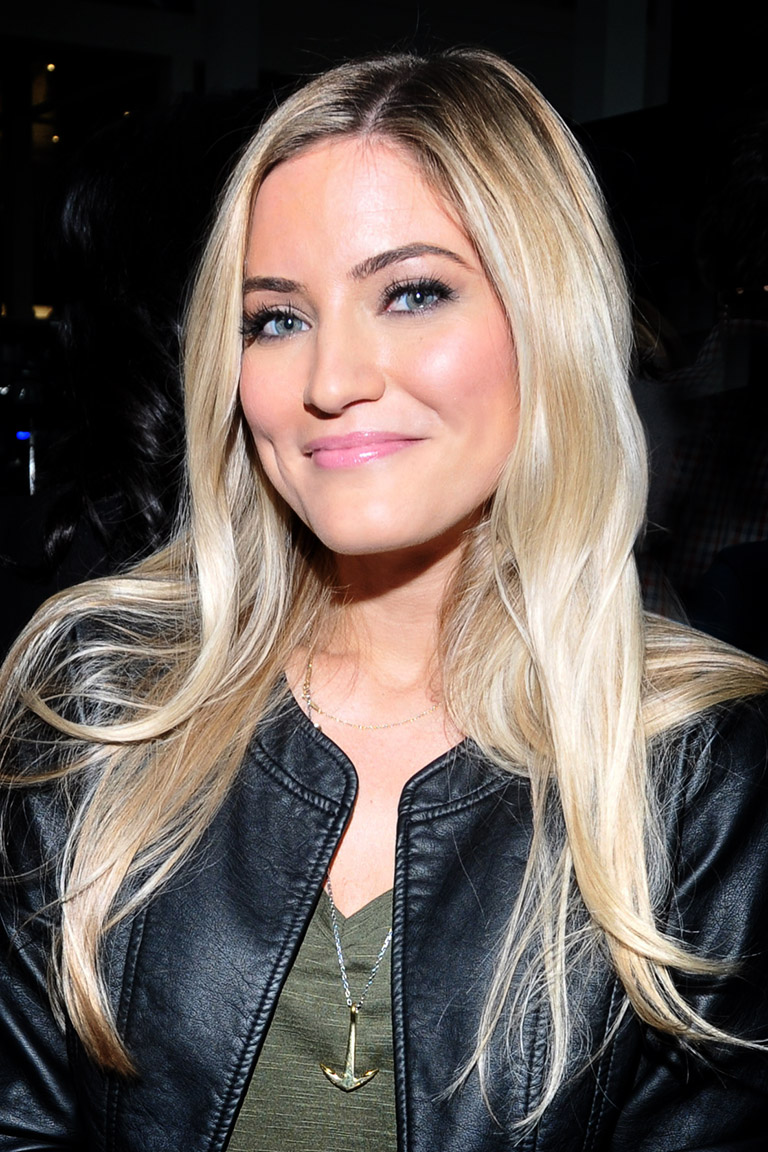
Justine Ezarik

Guests from the fourth season of Escape the Night
Guest	Persona	Outcome	Cause of Death
Bretman Rock	The Playboy	Escaped (Episode 10)	—N/a
Colleen Ballinger Season 3	The Duchess	Escaped (Episode 10)	—N/a
Joey Graceffa	The Savant	Unknown (Episode 10)	Stayed behind; vanished into Pandora's Box
Rosanna Pansino Season 3	The Socialite	Dead (Episode 9)	Eaten alive by dinosaurs
Alex Wassabi Season 2	The Aviator	Dead (Episode 8)	Shot in the chest three times by pirates
Gabbie Hanna Season 2	The Hollywood Star	Dead (Episode 5) (Note: Graceffa has said this double elimination was arranged in advance by production.)	Stabbed by the Black Knight
Tana Mongeau Season 2	The Pin-up Girl	Dead (Episode 5)	Stabbed by the Black Knight
DeStorm Power Season 2	The Enforcer	Dead (Episode 4)	Stabbed by the Emperor after sacrificing himself
Timothy DeLaGhetto Season 1	The Con Man	Dead (Episode 3)	Battered to death by Garuda
Justine Ezarik Season 1	The Adventurer	Dead (Episode 2)	Strangled by the Pharaoh

== Cast ==
The museum's inhabitants and the antagonists of each exhibit were played by actors.

=== Recurring ===
Character	Role	Outcome
The Collector	Ruler of the Museum of the Dead, who travels between eras collecting people, monsters, and creatures as exhibits	Killed by the Sorceress in Episode 9, but returns in the finale; defeated with the Sword of All Legends
The Sorceress	The second season's antagonist, held in the museum and allied with the guests	Kills the Collector, then claims the museum for herself and orders the guests back into their exhibits
Mortimer	The third season's ally, held in the museum as an exhibit	Turned to stone by the Gorgon in Episode 6

== Guest progress ==
Legend:

Guest escaped the night.
Guest was voted into a challenge or put into a challenge by losing a separate challenge and won.
Guest was not voted into a challenge but volunteered to compete in place of another guest.
Guest was voted into a challenge but did not compete as a separate guest volunteered to compete for them.
Guest was voted into a challenge and lost, but remained safe.
Guest was safe from the challenge.
Guest was revived.
Guest's fate is unknown.
Guest wasn't voted into a challenge, but died.
Guest was voted into a challenge or put into a challenge by losing a separate challenge and died.
Guest was immune and unable to be voted into the challenge.

Escape The Night season 4 voting and season history for each guest
	Episode 1	Episode 2	Episode 3	Episode 4	Episode 5	Episode 6	Episode 7	Episode 8	Episode 9	Episode 10
Voted Players	(None)	Justine; Tana	DeStorm; Timothy	Alex; DeStorm	Gabbie; Tana	Alex; Colleen	~~Alex~~; Bretman; Joey	Alex; Bretman; Joey	Bretman; Rosanna	(None)
Challenge Winner(s)	(None)	Tana	DeStorm	Alex	(None)	Alex	Joey	Bretman; Joey	Bretman	(None)
Eliminated	(None)	Justine	Timothy	DeStorm	Gabbie; Tana	Colleen	(None)	Alex	Rosanna	(None)
Bretman	No vote	Timothy	15 coins	Alex	Joey	Colleen	Bretman	Won	Rosanna	Escaped
Colleen	No vote	Justine	18 coins	Alex	Tana	Alex		Revived	Bretman	Escaped
Joey	No vote	Justine	14 coins	Alex	Gabbie	Joey	Joey	Won	Rosanna	Unknown
Rosanna	No vote	Timothy	23 coins	Immune	Joey	Alex	Rosanna	Immune	Bretman	
Alex	No vote	Justine	25 coins	Colleen	Joey	Rosanna	Alex	Lost		
Gabbie	No vote	Alex	23 coins	DeStorm	Joey					
Tana	No vote	Timothy	21 coins	DeStorm	Unknown					
DeStorm	No vote	Rosanna	0 coins	Alex						
Timothy	No vote	Tana	13 coins							
Justine	No vote	Alex								

== Challenges ==
Legend:

The guest was eliminated but was never voted for a challenge.
The guest was eliminated after their first time being voted for a challenge.
The guest was eliminated after their second time being voted for a challenge.
The guest was eliminated after their third time being voted for a challenge.

Episode	Guest(s)			Challenge	Eliminated	Cause of Death
2	Justine Ezarik	vs.	Tana Mongeau	In the Sands of Egypt, the two raced through the tomb's trials — placing twin sphinxes and claiming the Scepter of Isis, which could not be touched directly — to command the Pharaoh's mummy.	Justine Ezarik	Strangled to death by the Pharaoh.
3	DeStorm Power	vs.	Timothy DeLaGhetto	The two guests who finished the episode's coin game with the fewest coins were forced into the demon Garuda's trial, competing to survive his attacks and complete his tasks.	Timothy DeLaGhetto	Battered to death by Garuda.
4	Alex Wassabi	vs.	DeStorm Power	At the Emperor's wedding, the two competed in a tile game amid zombies for the Emperor's entertainment. DeStorm, declaring that he played by his own rules and dedicating the moment to Lauren Riihimaki, deliberately broke the rules and forfeited his life.	DeStorm Power	Stabbed by the Emperor.
5	Gabbie Hanna	vs.	Tana Mongeau	Protected by a fairy light, the two had to build four symbols of power before the light died, with each allowed to help the other; if they succeeded, both could survive. The light failed before they finished.	Gabbie Hanna	Stabbed by the Black Knight.
5	Gabbie Hanna	vs.	Tana Mongeau	Protected by a fairy light, the two had to build four symbols of power before the light died, with each allowed to help the other; if they succeeded, both could survive. The light failed before they finished.	Tana Mongeau	Stabbed by the Black Knight.
6	Alex Wassabi	vs.	Colleen Ballinger	Each nominee assembled a puzzle from pieces their guardian angel retrieved from the Minotaur's maze — Matthew Patrick for Colleen and Nikita Dragun for Alex.	Colleen Ballinger	Crushed by the Minotaur.
7	Bretman Rock	vs.	Joey Graceffa	Joey volunteered in place of Alex. Each competitor searched a bazaar for three items to complete a story; the group voted on the worst story, whose author's name would be written into the tale as its tragic death.	None	Scheherazade's name was written into the story instead.
8	Alex Wassabi vs. Bretman Rock vs. Joey Graceffa			After the guests invoked parley with a pirate captain, the three men each had to prove themselves "pirate worthy"; the pirates killed the one found unworthy.	Alex Wassabi	Shot in the chest three times by pirates.
9	Bretman Rock	vs.	Rosanna Pansino	The two ventured into the raptors' territory in the prehistoric exhibit in the season's final duel.	Rosanna Pansino	Eaten alive by dinosaurs.

== Episodes ==
No. overall	No. in season	Title	Original release date
31	1	"The Museum of Death Part 1"	July 11, 2019
A montage retraces the series' toll — the estate, the masquerade, Everlock — as Joey confesses that every death was the price of his mistakes, and that he wants "a way to make all of the wrongs I did right". Answering his dead friends' plea to "come save us", he joins forces with the Society Against Evil and Nikita Dragun — who, against Joey's instructions, brings newcomer Bretman Rock — and opens a gateway to purgatory using three artifacts from past seasons: the Sorceress's crown, a cursed artifact from the estate, and Everlock's life crystal. The Museum: The portal collapses behind Joey and Bretman, stranding them inside the Museum of the Dead, where the Collector keeps souls from across time as exhibits. Joey frees eight of his friends, but the reunion is uneasy: several hold him responsible for their deaths. Among the museum's other prisoners are Mortimer and the Sorceress, who offers the guests her help. The Stakes: With the exhibits now loose, the guests learn that when the Armageddon clock strikes the morning hour, everyone outside their exhibit will be burned to ash. The Egyptian exhibit awakens first, and the guests investigate the Pharaoh's tomb. Eliminated: None — the episode ends mid-ritual, as the guests surround the sarcophagus with the Ankh and call on Anubis to release the Pharaoh's soul so his murder can be avenged.
32	2	"The Museum of Death Part 2"	July 11, 2019
The guests solve the mystery of the Pharaoh's murder — the killer was his wife — and take control of the mummy. Wrong placements in the tomb's puzzle put guests' cards in the voting pile. Voted into the challenge: Justine and Tana. Death Challenge: In the Sands of Egypt, the two race through the tomb's trials, placing twin sphinxes and claiming the Scepter of Isis — which cannot be touched by hand — to command the Pharaoh. Challenge Winner: Tana, in an upset the group did not see coming. Eliminated: Justine Ezarik (The Adventurer) — strangled by the Pharaoh. Justine fights back against the mummy before her death, which echoes her first: "It seems like just yesterday that I was buried alive." Notes: The first key is claimed as something new stirs in the fog.
33	3	"A Deal With A Demon"	July 17, 2019
The museum's evil begins to infect the guests as the exhibit of the demon Garuda opens. The Coin Game (replacing the vote): The guests play a social game of gaining, stealing, and gifting coins through prompted choices — Joey pointedly gives his coins to Colleen to begin repairing their broken trust. When the bags are opened, the rule is revealed: "the two with the fewest coins at the end" will be forced into the final challenge. Forced into the challenge: DeStorm (0 coins) and Timothy (13 coins). Death Challenge: The two compete through Garuda's trial, surviving the demon's attacks to finish his tasks. Challenge Winner: DeStorm — whose ruthless play ("Survival of the fittest") draws open condemnation from the group. Eliminated: Timothy DeLaGhetto (The Con Man) — battered to death by Garuda. Notes: Another life is exchanged for a key; this is the season's only elimination decided by a social game rather than a vote.
34	4	"A Wedding To Die For"	July 24, 2019
The Emperor's exhibit calls for a bride, and Rosanna talks her way into the role as the guests infiltrate the wedding. Voted into the challenge: Alex, who failed his task, and DeStorm — reviving the feud that defined their second season, in which DeStorm had beaten Lauren Riihimaki in the challenge that killed her. Death Challenge: The two compete in a tile game amid zombies to entertain the Emperor. Stuck and falling behind, DeStorm declares, "I play by my own rules. This is for Lauren," and moves diagonally — breaking the rules and sacrificing himself. Eliminated: DeStorm Power (The Enforcer) — stabbed by the Emperor. The wedding then collapses into a massacre, and Rosanna grabs the key. Notes: Alex returns renouncing the darkness he had been flirting with: "I just saw a lot of evil... and I don't want to do that anymore." The episode ends with hoofbeats and a warning — "Death is coming for you" — as the Black Knight's exhibit opens.
35	5	"Dark Magic and A Twisted Fate"	July 31, 2019
A flashback shows the Black Knight taking Excalibur as Camelot falls. In the present, Merlin enlists the guests to free the sword. Gabbie and Tana drink from cursed chalices, placing their names in the voting pile. Voted into the challenge: Gabbie and Tana — a rematch of their second-season pairing, in which both survived. Several guests also vote for Joey, whom a scripture about a "king" had led them to think should compete. Death Challenge: Protected inside a circle of fairy light, the two must build four symbols of power before the light dies; each may help the other, and if they succeed, both can survive. Before starting, the two reconcile after years of friction. Tana finishes her own puzzles and begins on Gabbie's, but the light fails first. Eliminated: Gabbie Hanna (The Hollywood Star) and Tana Mongeau (The Pin-up Girl) — both stabbed by the Black Knight, the season's only double elimination. Notes: Rallied by Alex, the others fight on; Merlin is killed, but the group finishes the puzzle, and Colleen drinks the tears of the Lady of the Lake, draws Excalibur, and slays the Black Knight, claiming the key. The guests also recover a guardian angel stone, to be saved "for your rainiest days".
36	6	"The Maze of Terror"	August 7, 2019
The Gorgon returns and turns Mortimer to stone — the rainy day the stone was saved for. Invoking it, the guests summon Matthew Patrick and Nikita Dragun from the dead as guardian angels, whose magic can hold only so long in the museum. Investigation: In the Minotaur's maze, guests who fail its tasks are trapped. Offered immunity if he places his captured friends' names in the voting pile — including two who had voted him into the previous challenge — Joey puts in his own instead to free them. Voted into the challenge: Alex, who asked to be voted in, and Colleen. The first guest drawn chooses a guardian angel: Colleen chooses Matthew, leaving Nikita to aid Alex. Death Challenge: The angels search the maze for puzzle pieces while the nominees assemble them. Nikita knocks over Colleen's nearly finished puzzle, and both Matthew and Colleen are killed by the Minotaur. Challenge Winner: Alex, who takes control of the Minotaur. Eliminated: Colleen Ballinger (The Duchess) — crushed by the Minotaur. Notes: The Gorgon and the Minotaur are killed and the key is secured. A newly opened chest bears a warning: "Wishes are not free."
37	7	"Be Careful What You Wish For"	August 14, 2019
The guests venture into the Arabian exhibit, where a genie offers a key and a wish in exchange for her freedom, and the storyteller Scheherazade holds the next challenge. Voted into the challenge: Alex and Bretman. Bretman, Rosanna, and Joey — the three guests who have not yet competed in a death challenge — agree to vote for themselves, but Alex, who has competed more than anyone, is drawn along with Bretman. Joey volunteers to take Alex's place, hoping to prove to the group that he can be trusted. Death Challenge: Each competitor searches the bazaar for three items to complete a story; the group votes on the worst, and its author's name will be written into the tale as its tragic death. Eliminated: None — Bretman's story is voted the worst, but Scheherazade's own name is written into the tale instead, and both competitors are spared. Notes: The magic holding Nikita in the museum fails, and she fades back to the dead. Freed, the genie gives the guests the key and a wish to bring back one of their dead friends; Joey makes the wish in a whisper, telling the group only that he knows what is best for them.
38	8	"Cursed Treasure"	August 21, 2019
Joey's whispered wish is revealed as Colleen returns from the dead, permanently restored. Pirates then invade the museum, seizing the guests' newly found key. Into the challenge: The guests invoke parley under pirate's law, and Alex, Bretman, and Joey must each take the pirate's test; no vote is held. Death Challenge: Each man must prove himself "pirate worthy" to the captain. Challenge Winners: Bretman and Joey. Eliminated: Alex Wassabi (The Aviator) — found unworthy and shot in the chest three times by the pirates. Notes: The guests claim another key.
39	9	"Prehistoric Evil"	August 28, 2019
The final four enter the prehistoric exhibit, the museum's oldest wing, and befriend a Caveman through cave paintings and charades. They learn that the Caveman's lover was murdered by the Cursed God. Voted into the challenge: Bretman and Rosanna. Death Challenge: The two venture into the raptors' territory in the season's final duel. Challenge Winner: Bretman. Eliminated: Rosanna Pansino (The Socialite) — torn apart and eaten by dinosaurs. Notes: Behind an iron vault lies the cosmic sphere, an artifact with the power to reshape space and time, and Joey finds the room where the rest of his dead friends have been kept. Facing the Collector, the guests unleash the Sorceress, who kills her — then declares the museum her own and orders the guests back into their exhibits, revealing that she had been using them all along.
40	10	"The Collector Returns"	September 4, 2019
The Collector, who cannot be slain inside her own museum, returns. Any guest her monsters capture will be taken to the Gorgon's lair and held for two minutes before being killed. Final Investigation: A note reveals that the Collector can be turned to stone by the Sword of All Legends. The guests learn that the Gorgon was once a member of the Society Against Evil, turned by the Collector, and that her blood holds "the voice of vengeance". They place crystals around Excalibur, pour the Gorgon's blood over it, and forge the Sword of All Legends. Endgame: The Sorceress falls, and the guests defeat the Collector. With five minutes left, they place the final key in the vault and retrieve the cosmic sphere. Joey finds himself drawn to Pandora's Box, saying he "can't stop" himself from wanting to touch it, and is told that he will save the others. As Colleen and Bretman flee through the portal, Joey stays behind. Eliminated: None in a challenge. Escaped: Bretman Rock and Colleen Ballinger, who are greeted on the other side by Alex, restored to life. Asked what happened, they can only answer that Joey did not come through. Outcome — Joey Graceffa: Unknown. Joey does not come through the portal; the official synopsis of The Lost Tapes later establishes that he "vanished into Pandora's Box".

== Awards and nominations ==
Award	Year	Category	Recipient(s) and nominee(s)	Result	Ref.
Streamy Awards	2019	Best Costume Design	Olivia Hines	Nominated	
Streamy Awards	2019	Best Editing	Steve Grubel	Won	
Streamy Awards	2019	Best Ensemble Cast	Escape the Night	Nominated	
Streamy Awards	2019	Best Unscripted Series	Escape the Night	Won	
Streamy Awards	2019	Show of the Year	Escape the Night	Nominated	

== See also ==
- Murder in Small Town X
- The Murder Game
- Whodunnit?
- The Quest
