= Escape the Night: The Lost Tapes =

Miniseries finale of Escape the Night

- No. of contestants: 6
- Winner: None designated (Note: Graceffa has said the miniseries was designed with no intended survivors, while describing the fates of Nikita Dragun and Manny MUA as "up to interpretation".)
- No. of episodes: 3

Release
- Original network: Tubi
- Original release: November 27, 2025

Season chronology
- ← Previous; Season 4

Escape the Night: The Lost Tapes is a three-episode miniseries created by Joey Graceffa and released exclusively on Tubi. A sequel to the YouTube Premium original series Escape the Night, it was presented as a "grand finale" to the franchise.

Picking up years after Graceffa's Savant vanished into Pandora's Box at the end of the fourth season, the miniseries finds him marooned inside the box, in a limbo resembling a 1980s video rental store. Five friends — four series veterans and newcomer JoJo Siwa — are pulled in after one of them receives a package containing a VHS tape, arriving in 1980s costume. There they discover a shelf of cursed VHS tapes, each of which, when played, unleashes the horror recorded on it. The miniseries ends with Graceffa's fate unresolved; Graceffa has said the ending was deliberately left open to interpretation.

== Format ==
Unlike the parent series' season-long artifact quests, The Lost Tapes is built around the cursed tapes themselves: each of the three episodes takes its title and its threat from one videotape — Silent Night, Red Mask, and Space Parasite — whose playback releases that tape's horror. The guests must survive each unleashed horror, working through its rules and puzzles to recover the next tape, while searching for a way out of Pandora's Box.

The competitive structure is correspondingly compressed. Only the second episode uses the series' traditional vote and death challenge, with guests voting by card; the first and third episodes instead stake lives on group survival challenges in which being captured twice, or falling behind the group, is fatal. The storyline was scripted, while the challenges were played live and unscripted. Graceffa has said that the miniseries was planned from the outset with no intended survivors.

== Production ==
On November 2, 2023, Graceffa launched an Indiegogo campaign seeking $250,000 to fund a film continuation of the series. The campaign fell short of the amount needed for a film. Graceffa later said that the production had hoped to raise a million dollars to make a movie, but that the campaign raised about $130,000, enough to fund a single episode; the footage captured was then expanded into three parts.

In September 2024, Graceffa said that the production had experienced setbacks, including the departure of the original director due to personal circumstances. He also said that the project faced a financial deadline, as funds raised through Indiegogo had to be used by the end of 2024 or a significant portion would be lost for tax reasons. Graceffa later said that Adam Lawson, the series' usual writer and director, left the project about five months before filming, and that the production was filmed unscripted, like the earlier seasons.

Production took place at Willow Studios in Los Angeles, California, using the facility's basement level, which includes several pre-built environments commonly used for horror and thriller productions, such as a jail area, mechanic room, hallways, and meat lockers. During development, Graceffa asked viewers whether the project should be released as a single film or divided into three parts. It was ultimately released on Tubi as a three-part miniseries under the title Escape the Night: The Lost Tapes.

== Guests ==
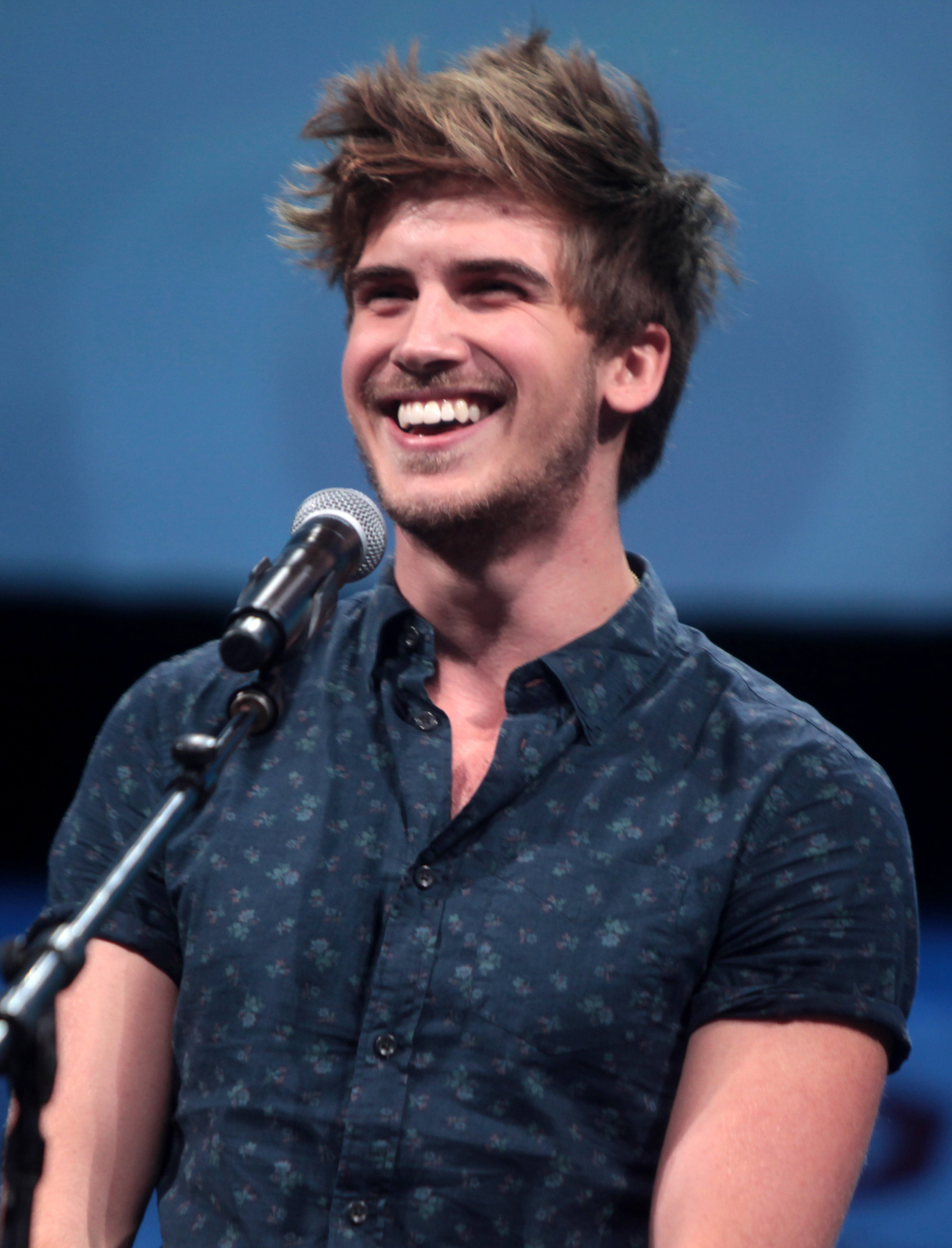
Joey Graceffa

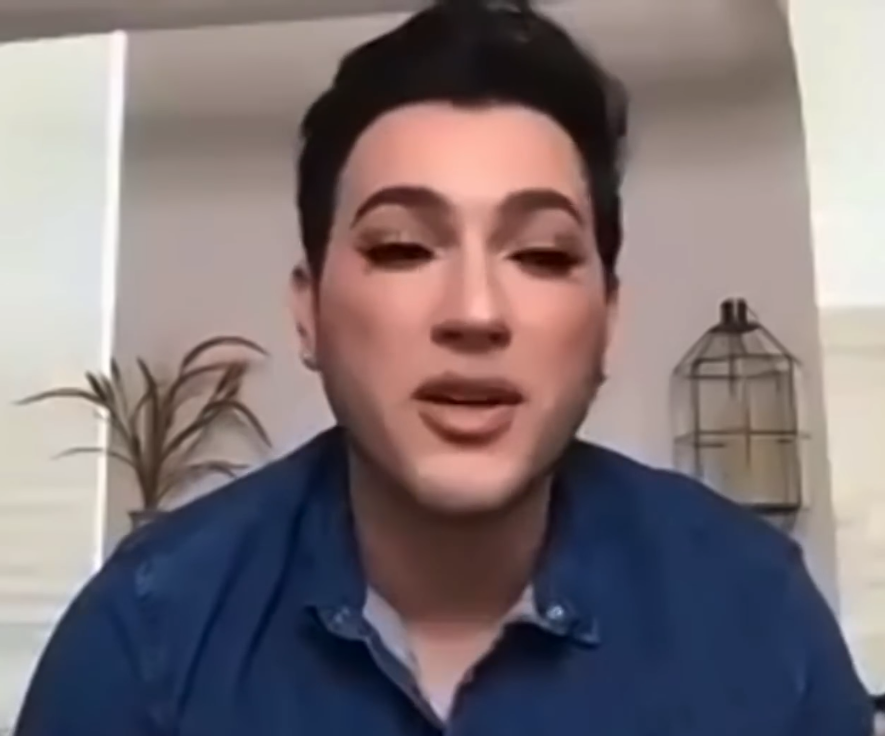
Manny MUA

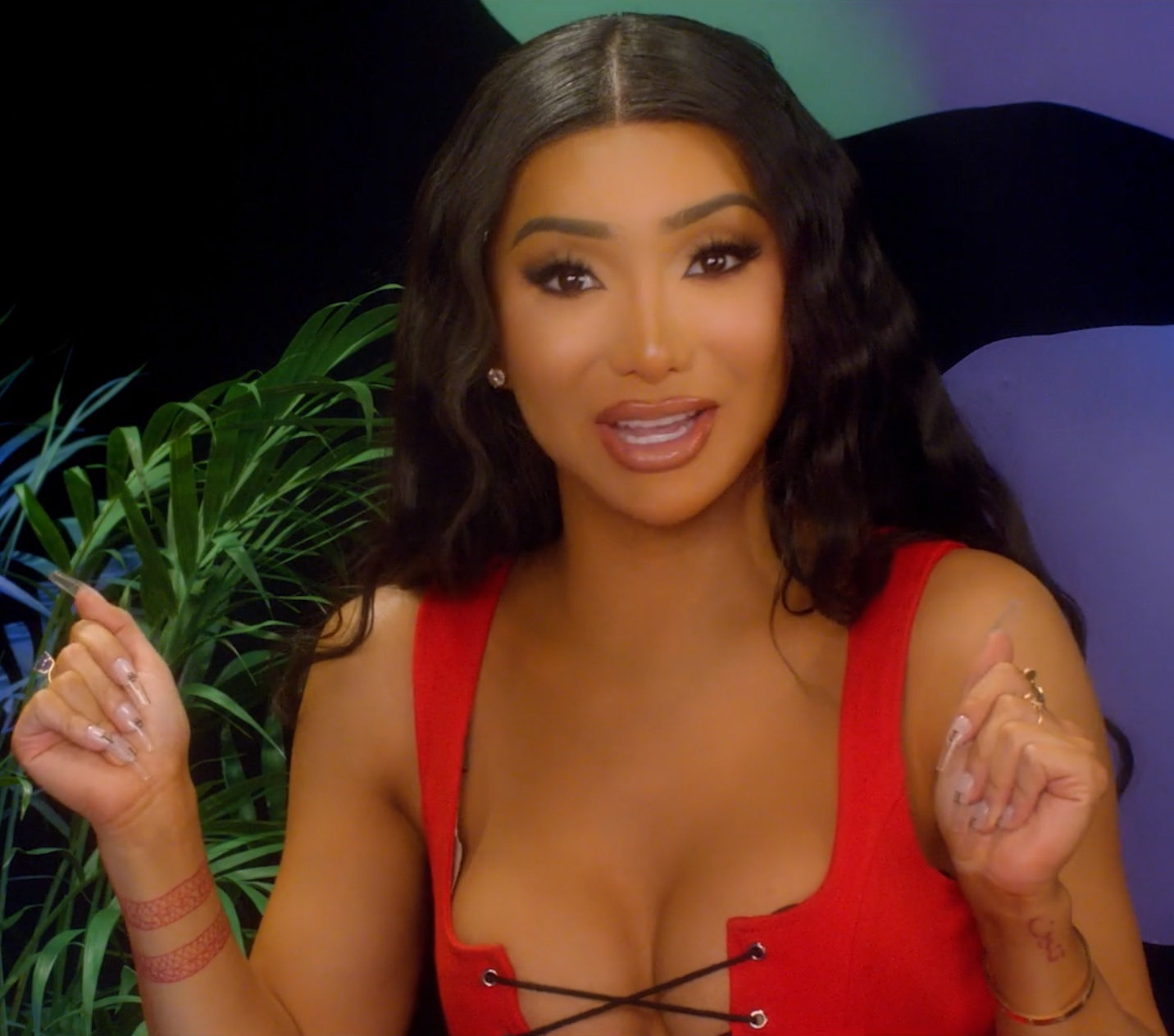
Nikita Dragun

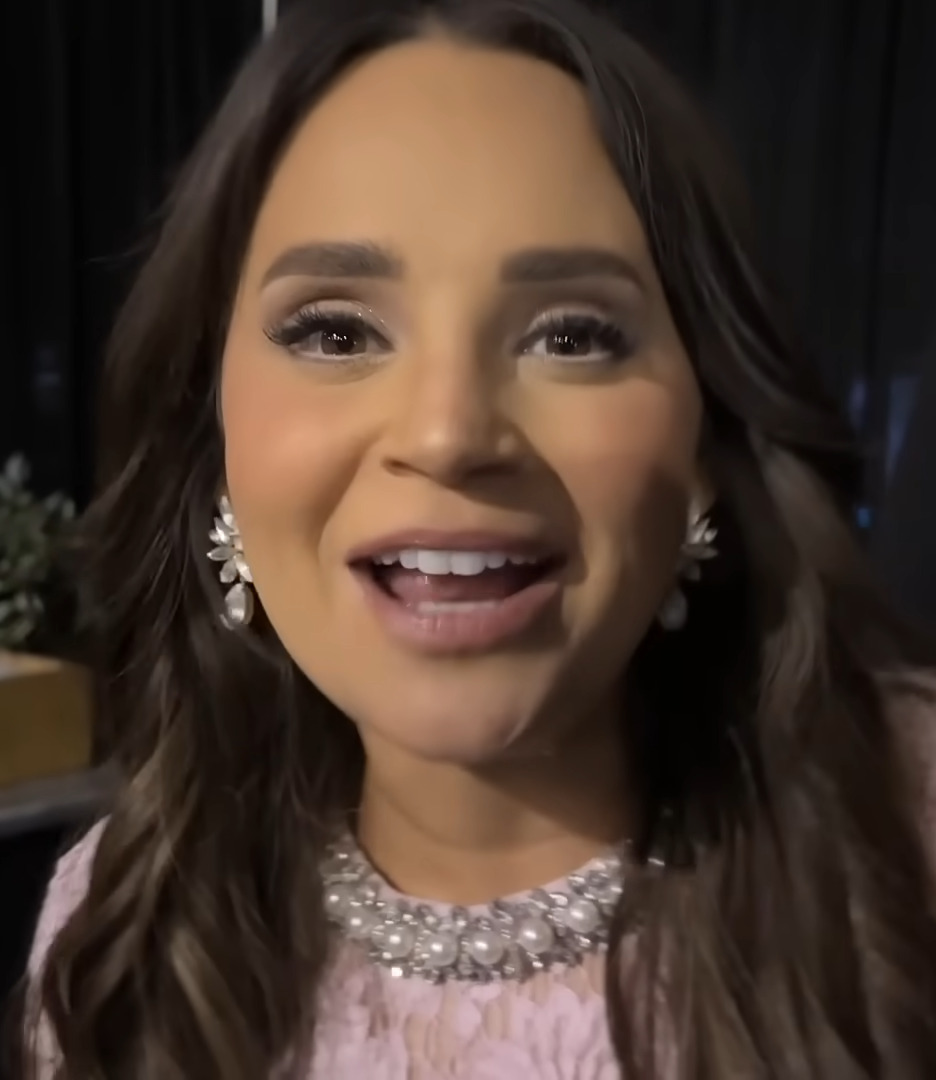
Rosanna Pansino

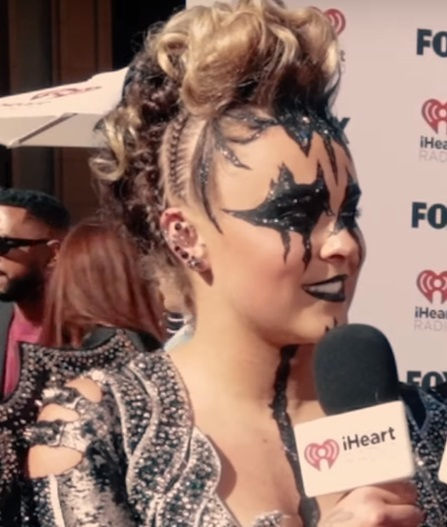
Jojo Siwa

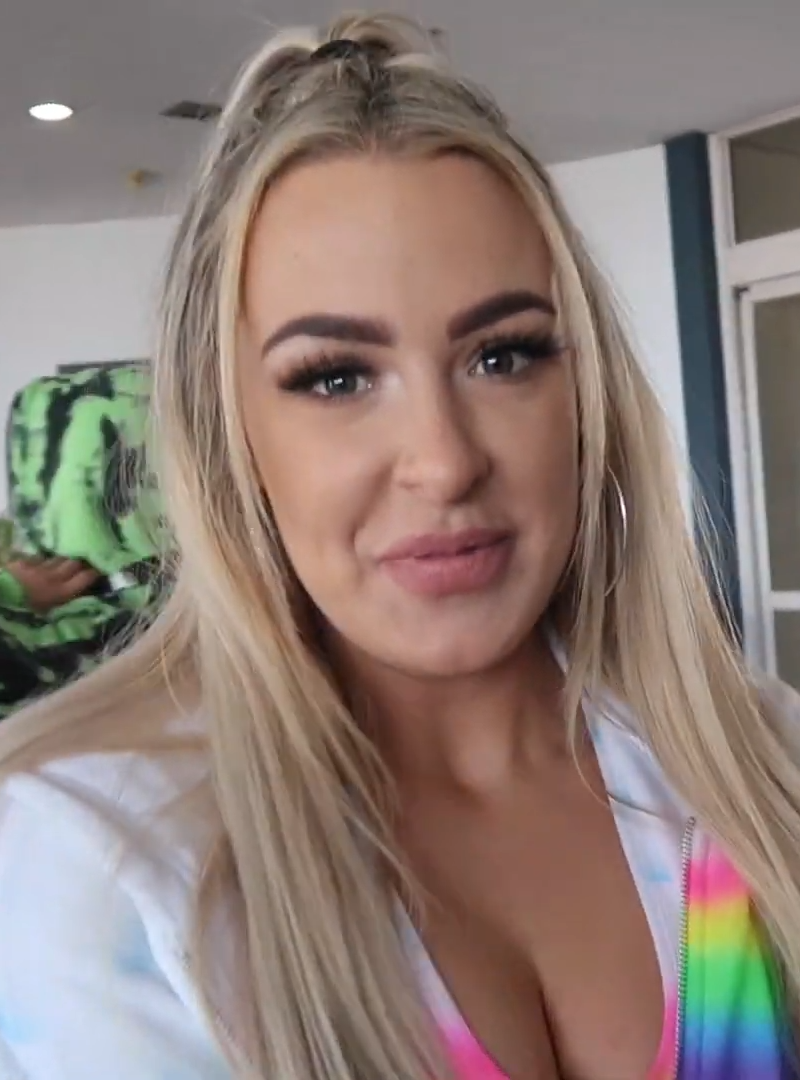
Tana Mongeau

Guests of Escape the Night: The Lost Tapes
Guest	Persona	Status	Cause of Death
Joey Graceffa	The Savant	Unknown (Episode 3)	—N/a
Manny MUA Season 3	The Jock	Unknown (Episode 3)	—N/a
Nikita Dragun Season 3	The Glam Rocker	Unknown (Episode 3)	—N/a
Rosanna Pansino Season 3 & Season 4	The Fitness Instructor	Dead (Episode 3)	Torn open by an alien creature bursting from her abdomen
Jojo Siwa	The Burnout	Dead (Episode 2)	Killed by the cult of the Cursed God
Tana Mongeau Season 2 & Season 4	The Prom Queen	Dead (Episode 1)	Sliced in half by the Minotaur's chainsaw

== Guest history ==
Legend:

Guest's fate is unknown.
Guest was voted into a challenge and won.
Guest was declared safe from the challenge.
Guest was captured or fell behind and died.
Guest was voted into a challenge and died.

Escape The Night: The Lost Tapes voting history
	Episode 1	Episode 2	Episode 3	
Voted Players	(None)	Jojo; Manny	(None)	
Challenge Winner(s)	(None)	Manny	(None)	
Eliminated	Tana	Jojo	Rosanna	(None)
Joey	Safe	Jojo	Safe	Unknown
Manny	Safe	Jojo	Safe	Unknown
Nikita	Safe	Manny	Safe	Unknown
Rosanna	Safe	Manny	Dead	
Jojo	Safe	Nikita		
Tana	Dead			

== Challenges ==
Episode	Guest(s)			Challenge	Eliminated	Cause of Death
1	Everyone			The guests had to recover three gems stolen by goblins and unlock a chest by passing three tests while evading the Minotaur; any guest captured twice would be killed.	Tana Mongeau	Sliced in half by the Minotaur's chainsaw.
2	Jojo Siwa	vs.	Manny MUA	To obtain the next tape, the two had to infiltrate a cult of the Cursed God by completing its three initiation tasks: performing a sacred chant to awaken the Cursed God, drinking from a chalice of blood, and enduring a trial of balance.	Jojo Siwa	Killed by the cult after failing the final task.
3	Everyone			Infested with alien parasites, the guests had to mix and drink an antidote; drinking it removed their protection, and the guest left behind as the group fled was seized by an invisible force.	Rosanna Pansino	Pulled backward by an invisible force and torn open as an alien creature burst from her abdomen.

== Episodes ==
No. overall	No. in season	Title	Original release date
41	1	"Silent Night"	November 27, 2025
A package arrives addressed to "Joseph G", in the care of Manny, containing a VHS tape. When it is played, Manny, Nikita, Rosanna, Tana, and Jojo — each dressed in 1980s costume — are pulled into Pandora's Box and find themselves in what looks like a long-defunct video rental store. There they find Joey, who assumes they have come to rescue him and says he has been alone inside the box for "maybe years". None of them know how they got there or what the tape was for; Joey concludes that only the Cursed God could be behind it, since he had no part in inviting them. One guest remarks that, much as she loves Joey, he has "killed me twice now". On the store's shelves waits a library of VHS tapes; the first, Silent Night, is played, and its horror steps out of the recording. Group Challenge: The guests must recover three gems created by a divine spirit and stolen by goblins, and pass three tests to unlock a chest, while evading a Minotaur; according to a journal, any guest captured twice will be killed. Eliminated: Tana Mongeau (The Prom Queen) — captured twice and sliced in half by the Minotaur's chainsaw, to the shock of Jojo, the only guest new to the series. Notes: There is no vote in this episode.
42	2	"Red Mask"	November 27, 2025
The second tape, Red Mask, shows footage of a cult whose members chant "All hail the cursed god" — and the guests are drawn into the cult's world. Voted into the challenge: Jojo and Manny. A note orders that "two must infiltrate the cult" to obtain the next tape, and the guests vote with cards — the miniseries' only traditional vote. Jojo, far from dreading it, says that she would have had "FOMO" had she not been chosen. Death Challenge: To be accepted as members, the two must complete the cult's three tasks: giving its sacred chant together to awaken the Cursed God, drinking from a chalice of blood, and enduring a trial of balance. Challenge Winner: Manny, who apologizes to Jojo as she falls: "My balance is better, babe!" Eliminated: Jojo Siwa (The Burnout) — killed by the cult. Notes: The next tape is recovered.
43	3	"Space Parasite"	November 27, 2025
The final tape, Space Parasite, is played, and the four remaining guests learn they are "infested with alien babies". Group Challenge: In a laboratory, the guests must mix and drink an antidote. Drinking it removes their protection, and as the group flees, an invisible force seizes the one left behind. Eliminated: Rosanna Pansino (The Fitness Instructor) — held immobile despite Joey, Manny, and Nikita's efforts to pull her free, then torn open as an alien creature bursts from her abdomen. One of the survivors reflects that she has seen Rosanna die so many times that it no longer affects her, "but I love her". Endgame: No tape is recovered, and the survivors ask whether Rosanna died for nothing. An announcement thanks them for "choosing Pandora's Box" and reminds them to "be kind and rewind". The store's monsters break in as the survivors try to guard the doors, and in the chaos Manny and Nikita are seized. Alone, Joey rewinds the tape and finds himself in a black void before Pandora's Box, holding an envelope and the deed to the estate from the first season. His eyes turn black as a voice tells him, "Know what you need to do." Closing: Over footage from the series' first cold open, Joey's narration folds the franchise back onto its beginning — "I thought I was running from the darkness, but I was the one who called it. I'm where it begins" — before the original invitation monologue replays. Outcomes: The fates of Joey, Manny, and Nikita are left unresolved.

== See also ==
- Murder in Small Town X
- The Murder Game
- Whodunnit?
- The Quest
