= Escape the Night season 3 =

Third season of Escape the Night

Escape the Night
- Season 3
- Promotional poster for season three.
- No. of contestants: 10
- Winners: Joey Graceffa; Matthew Patrick; Nikita Dragun
- No. of episodes: 10

Release
- Original network: YouTube Red
- Original release: June 21 – August 15, 2018

Season chronology
- ← Previous; Season 2 Next → Season 4

The third season of Escape the Night premiered on June 21, 2018, through YouTube Red, and concluded on August 15, 2018, after 10 episodes. Following his death in the second season finale, Joey Graceffa's Savant is offered a bargain in the world between worlds: if he saves the town of Everlock — trapped in time in the 1970s (Note: Promotional material for the season dates Everlock to 1978; the episodes refer only to "the 1970s".) by the Carnival Master — he will return to the living, but his friends "will need to die". He recruits nine fellow internet personalities, each dressed as a persona from the 1970s, without telling them the terms of his contract.

Three guests — Graceffa, Matthew Patrick, and Nikita Dragun — survived the night and escaped Everlock.

== Format ==
The season is set in Everlock, a small town locked in time on the night of its carnival by the Carnival Master, whose power flows from eight artifacts hidden throughout the town, each protected by one of his monstrous guardians. To free the town — and, secretly, to fulfill the contract that will return Joey to life — the guests must find and cleanse all eight artifacts before sunrise, when the Carnival Master will be released and the town destroyed. A map of Everlock reveals new locations each time an artifact is cleansed, and the guests regroup between challenges in a lounge that serves as their safe room.

Each episode centers on one artifact and its guardian. After a recap and a scripted flashback introducing the guardian, the guests solve that guardian's puzzles and trials, then typically vote two of their own into a lethal cleansing challenge; each guest picks a card, and an in-story character shuffles the cards and draws. The loser dies and the artifact is cleansed. The season varies this mechanism repeatedly: partners compete on behalf of the nominated guests in the first challenge; one guest earns automatic nomination by toppling the tower in a preliminary game; one episode replaces the challenge with a direct vote on who dies; one challenge instead kills the guest who voted for its winner; one sends every guest cursed during the episode into the trial together; and in one episode, any guest touched by the guardian has their name added to the vote.

The season also introduces resurrection to the series through the Harp of Lazarus, sealed in a box that can only be opened with two brass coins earned through optional side tasks. Once both coins are recovered, the guests use the harp to bring one dead friend back into the game. The storyline was scripted and performed with actors, while the votes and challenge outcomes were decided in play.

== Guests ==
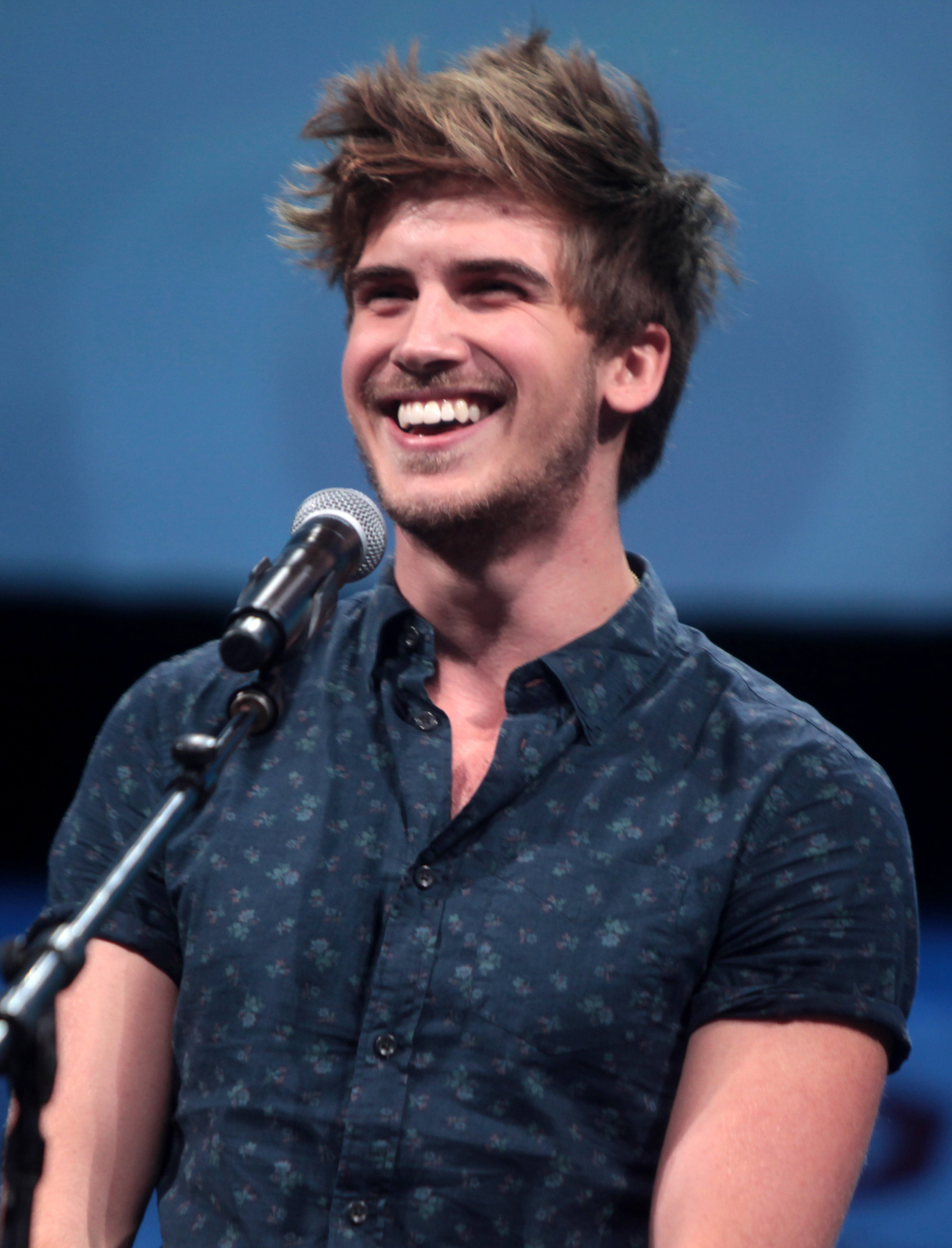
Joey Graceffa

Matthew Patrick

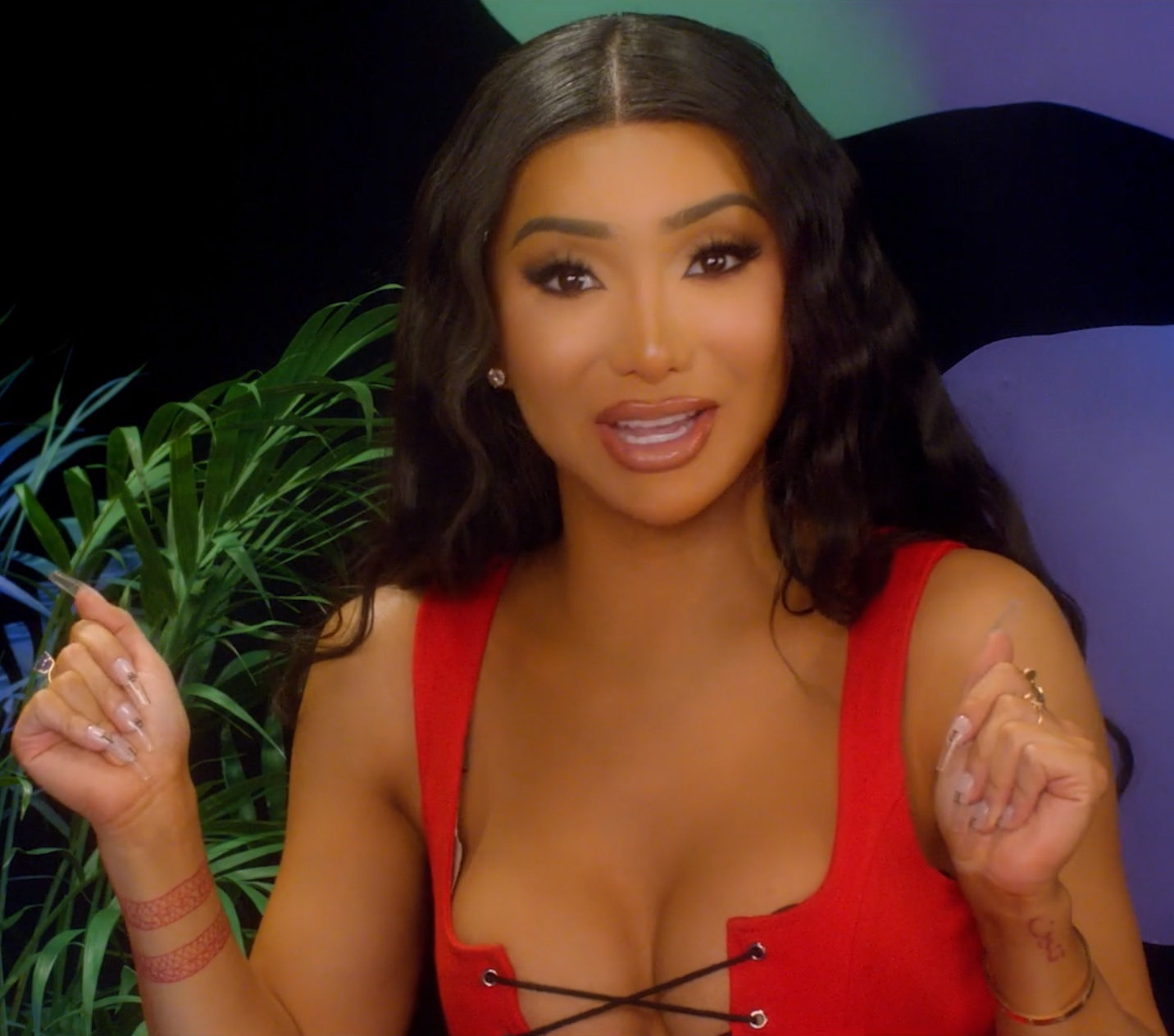
Nikita Dragun

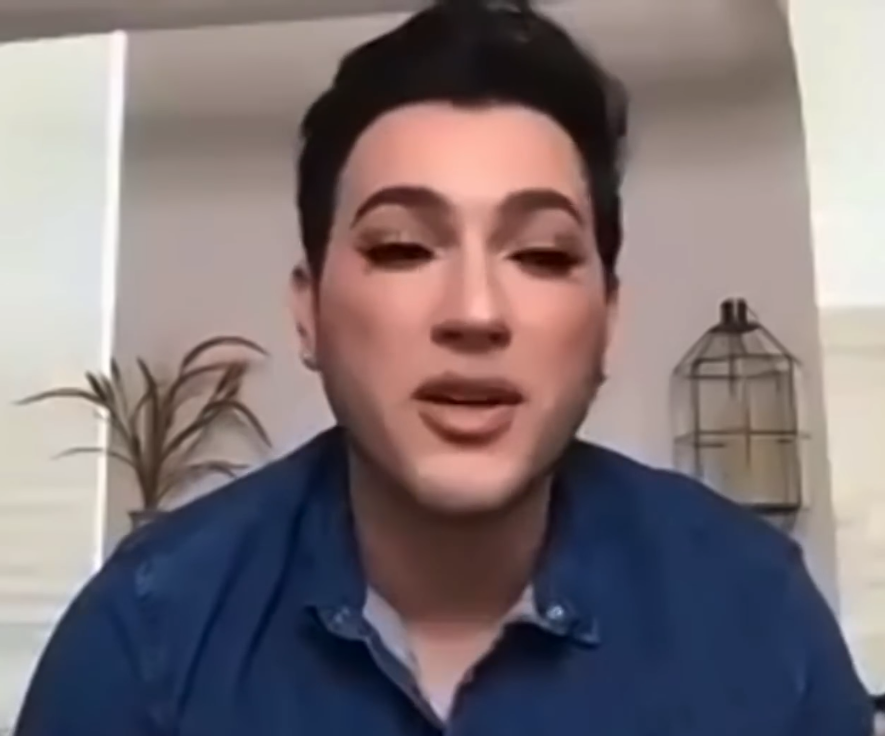
Manny MUA

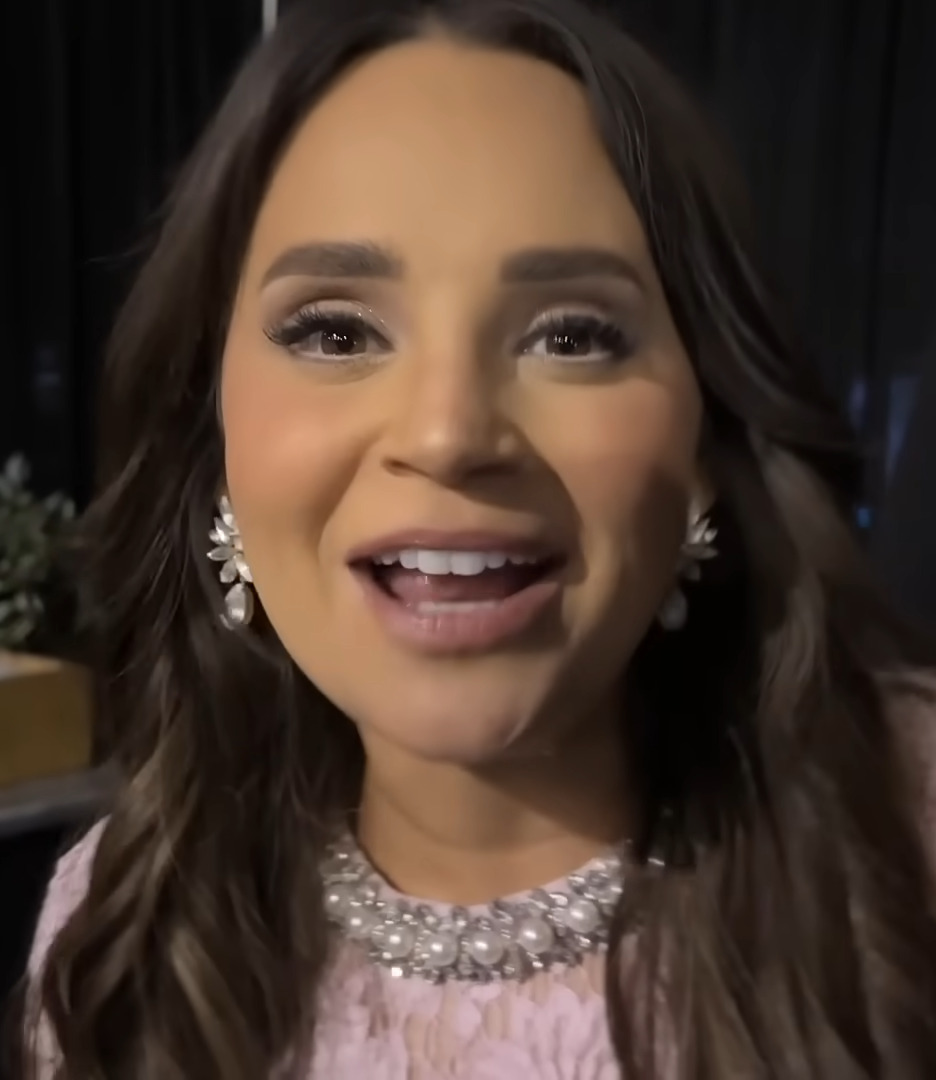
Rosanna Pansino

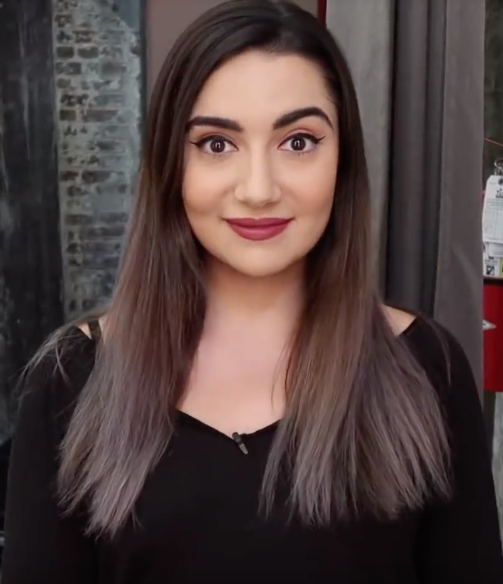
Safiya Nygaard

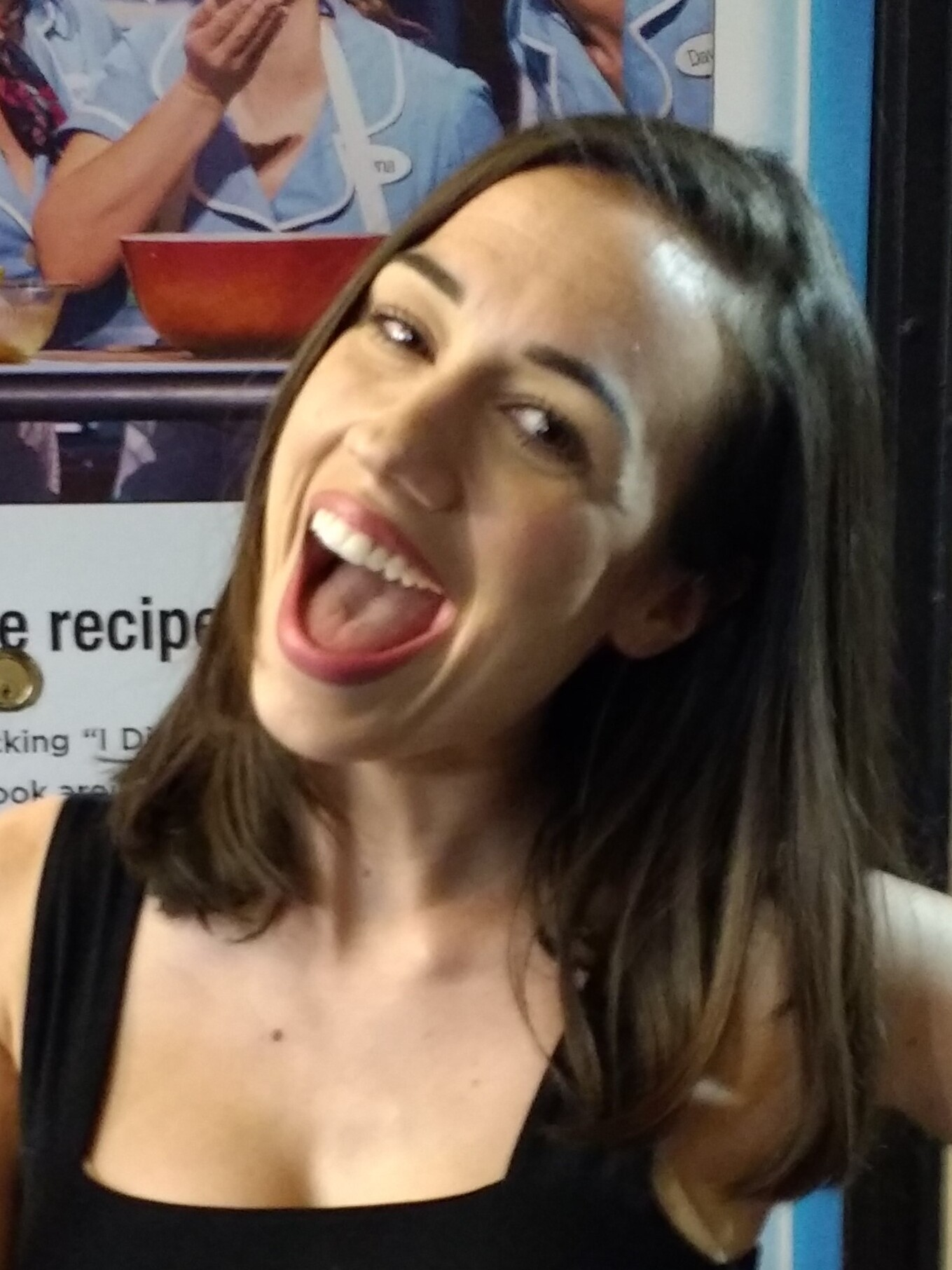
Colleen Ballinger

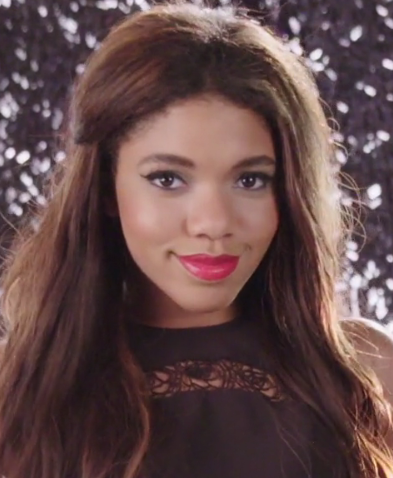
Teala Dunn

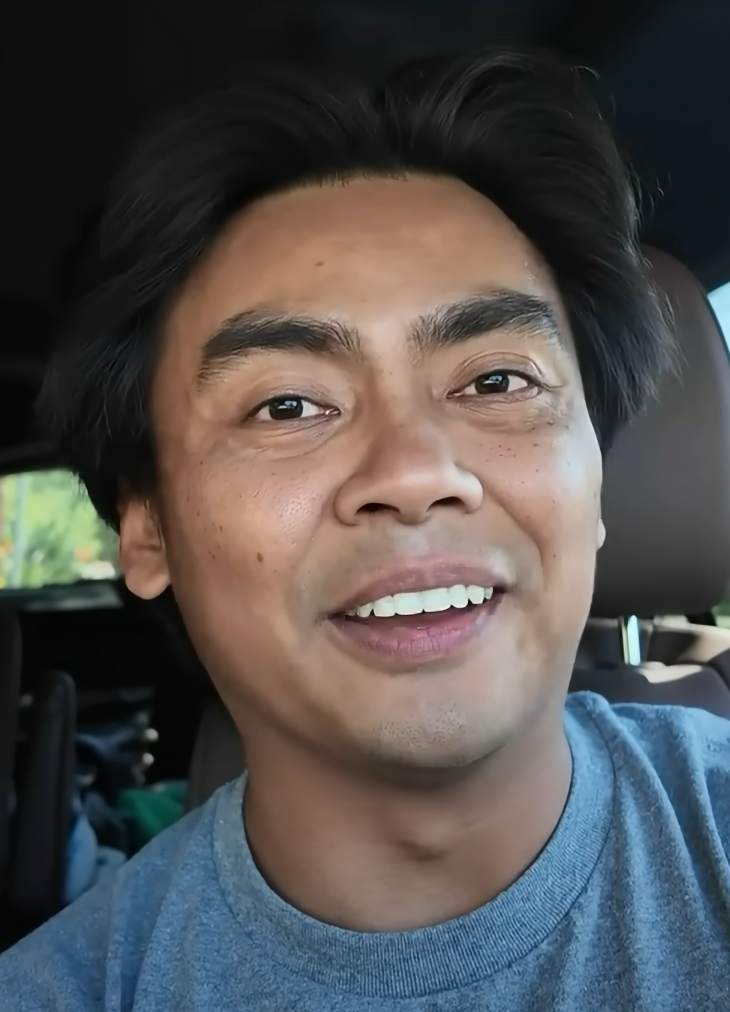
Roi Fabito

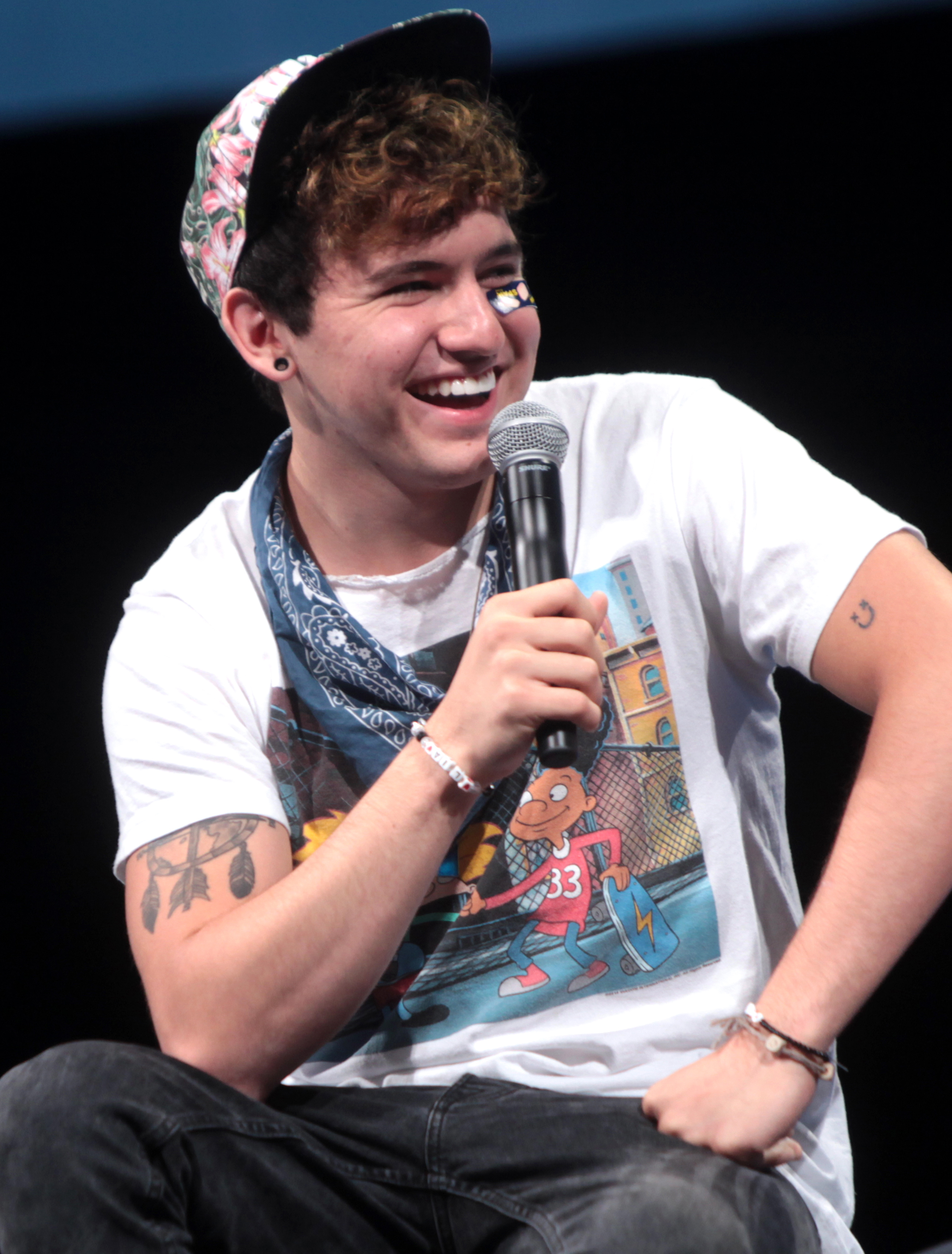
JC Caylen

Guests from the third season of Escape the Night
Guest	Persona	Outcome	Cause of Death
Joey Graceffa	The Savant	Escaped (Episode 10)	—N/a
Matthew Patrick	The Detective	Escaped (Episode 10)	—N/a
Nikita Dragun	The Troublemaker	Escaped (Episode 10)	—N/a
Manny Mua	The Record Producer	Dead (Episode 9)	Shot by Nikita
Rosanna Pansino	The Jet-Setter	Dead (Episode 8)	Stabbed to death by the three witches
Safiya Nygaard	The Investigative Reporter	Dead (Episode 7)	Stabbed with a fishhook by Willy
Colleen Ballinger	The Disco Dancer	Dead (Episode 6)	Impaled inside the Maiden of Madness
Teala Dunn	The Super Spy	Dead (Episode 4)	Strangled by Benjamin, the Man with No Name
Roi Fabito	The Daredevil	Dead (Episode 3)	Poisoned and bitten by the Snake Woman
JC Caylen	The Hippie	Dead (Episode 2)	Stabbed by knives thrown by the killer clowns

Note: Matthew Patrick was killed in Episode 5, beaten to death by the Strong Man, and revived in Episode 6 through the Harp of Lazarus, becoming the first guest in the series to return from the dead.

== Cast ==
The inhabitants of Everlock and the Carnival Master's forces were played by actors.

=== Recurring ===
Character	Played by	Role	Outcome
Mortimer	Jack O'Conner	Son of Mayor Janet and the guests' ally in Everlock	Corrupted by the Psychedelic Swirl; betrays the group by freeing the Carnival Master, who kills him
Calliope	Shontae Saldana	A member of the Society Against Evil who locked Everlock in time; the guests' guide	Killed by the Carnival Master after his release
The Carnival Master	Micah Fitzgerald	The season's main antagonist	Defeated in the finale

=== The guardians ===
Within the season's story, each of the Carnival Master's guardians protects one of the eight artifacts that must be cleansed.

Guardian	Played by	Episode(s)	Notes
The Killer Clowns	Alejandra Cejudo, Kerstin Schulze, Savannah Southern-Smith, Tyler James	1–2	Overrun Everlock at the carnival; their leader kills JC
Cindy, the Snake Woman	Siri Miller	3	Guardian of the Serpent's Eyes
Benjamin, the Man with No Name	Alexander Ward	4	His true name must be discovered to claim the Blood Gem
The Strong Man	Dean Jacobs (human); Brandon White (demon)	5	His title — and the artifact — pass to whoever defeats him
The Twin Dolls	Roy Johnson, Sammy the Dwarf	6	Keepers of the Maiden of Madness
Willy	Dan Aho	7	The funhouse's four-headed caretaker, embodying joy, anger, sadness, and fear
The Three Witches	Aylya Marzolf, Jamie VanDyke, Kaley Hatfield	8	Their curses on three townsfolk must be broken to cleanse the Wickerman Doll
Lucy and the Demon Dog	Taylor Nicolette (Lucy); Alexander Ward (Demon Dog)	9	The Carnival Master's daughter and her pet guard the final artifact

=== Minor characters ===
- Amy Johnston as Jael and Chris Wu as Ryu, members of the Society Against Evil
- Janet Wilson as Mayor Janet, the mayor of Everlock and Mortimer's mother, thrown from a balcony by a killer clown
- Donnabella Mortel as Veronica, the Strong Man's girlfriend
- Denis Sheperd as Sam, Mary Jessica Pitts and Linda Wolfe as Maria, and Clark Moore as Nolan — the three cursed citizens of Everlock whose curses must be broken to cleanse the Wickerman Doll

== Guest progress ==
Legend:

Guest escaped the third season of Escape the Night.
Guest was voted into a challenge and won.
Guest was selected as a partner for a challenge competitor and won, saving their partner.
Guest was selected as a partner for a challenge competitor and lost, causing their partner to die.
Guest was voted into a challenge and remained safe.
Guest was declared safe from the challenge.
Guest was declared to be revived from the Harp of Lazarus.
Guest wasn't voted into a challenge but died.
Guest was not voted into a challenge but instead voted to die.
Guest was voted into a challenge and died.
Guest was immune and unable to be voted into the challenge.

Escape The Night season 3 voting history
	1	2	3	4	5	6	7	8	9	10
Voted Players	(None)	JC; Teala	Nikita; Roi	Teala; Rosanna	Manny; Matthew	(None)	Manny; Nikita	Joey; Manny; Matthew; Rosanna	Manny; Nikita	(None)
Challenge Winner(s)	(None)	Teala	Nikita	Rosanna	Manny	(None)	Nikita	Joey; Manny; Matthew	Nikita	(None)
Eliminated	(None)	JC	Roi	Teala	Matthew	Colleen	Safiya	Rosanna	Manny	(None)
Joey	No vote	Teala	Teala	Teala	Matthew	Colleen	Safe	Won	Joey	Escaped
Matthew	No vote	JC	Nikita	Teala	Joey		Revived	Won	Matthew	Escaped
Nikita	No vote	Teala	Rosanna	Teala	Matthew	Colleen	Won	Safe	Nikita	Escaped
Manny	No vote	Roi	Colleen	Matthew	Matthew	Colleen	Safe	Won	Manny	
Rosanna	No vote	JC	Nikita	Teala	Manny	Colleen	Manny	Lost		
Safiya	No vote	Roi	Teala	Teala	Manny	Colleen	Nikita			
Colleen	No vote	Teala	Teala	Matthew	Joey	Rosanna				
Teala	No vote	Roi	Nikita	Rosanna						
Roi	No vote	Rosanna	Teala							
JC	No vote	Rosanna								

== Challenges ==
Legend:

The guest was eliminated but was never voted for a challenge.
The guest was eliminated after their first time being voted for a challenge.
The guest was eliminated after their second time being voted for a challenge.
The guest was eliminated after their fourth time being voted for a challenge.

Episode	Guest(s)			Challenge	Eliminated	Cause of Death
2	JC Caylen	vs.	Teala Dunn	While the two voted guests were tied to spinning wheels, their chosen partners raced through the killer clowns' four carnival trials.	JC Caylen	Stabbed to death by knives thrown by the killer clowns.
3	Roi Fabito	vs.	Nikita Dragun	Roi, who toppled the tower in the Serpent's preliminary game, faced a voted guest in searching the innards of a serpent and completing a mosaic to claim its heart, cleansing the artifact.	Roi Fabito	Poisoned and bitten by the Snake Woman.
4	Rosanna Pansino	vs.	Teala Dunn	Each nominee hunted letters of her assigned color in the dark to spell the true name of the Man with No Name and retrieve the Blood Gem that cleanses the artifact.	Teala Dunn	Strangled to death by Benjamin.
5	Manny Mua	vs.	Matthew Patrick	Two men were voted in to compete to become the next Strong Man and retrieve the holy band of leather that cleanses the artifact.	Matthew Patrick	Beaten to death by the Strong Man.
6	Colleen Ballinger			The group voted directly on which guest would be killed inside the Maiden of Madness to cleanse the artifact.	Colleen Ballinger	Trapped and impaled inside the Maiden of Madness.
7	Manny Mua	vs.	Nikita Dragun	The only two guests not captured in the funhouse voted two of the captured guests back into it; unbeknownst to them, the guest who voted for the winner would be killed.	Safiya Nygaard	Stabbed in the stomach with a fishhook by Willy.
8	Joey Graceffa vs. Manny Mua vs. Matthew Patrick vs. Rosanna Pansino			Every guest cursed by the witches during the episode had to pass through the witches' tangled skein to retrieve the amulet of youth; the last to pass through became the witches' sacrifice.	Rosanna Pansino	Stabbed to death by the three witches.
9	Manny Mua	vs.	Nikita Dragun	Straitjacketed, the two searched a pool of popcorn for a key to free themselves and reach a box holding "salvation" — a pink gun that the winner could turn on themselves or their opponent.	Manny Mua	Shot to death by Nikita.

== Episodes ==
No. overall	No. in season	Title	Original release date
21	1	"The Clowns Here Kill Part 1"	June 21, 2018
Dead after the second season's finale, Joey's soul reaches the world between worlds, where he is offered a way back to the living: "your friends will need to die." A contract binds him to the town of Everlock — save the town and he returns to the living; fail, and he is lost among the dead forever. Concealing the bargain, Joey sends invitations to nine friends, asking for their help on "an extraordinary adventure", and leads them through a doorway into Everlock, a town trapped in the 1970s on the night of its carnival. Inciting incident: The town's welcome sours as killer clowns overrun the carnival at the appointed hour — Mayor Janet is thrown from a balcony, and the guests learn that the Carnival Master's summoning ritual is underway. A vital box is stolen from the group, and the trail points to Mortimer. Eliminated: None — the episode ends on a cliffhanger as the clown leader forces the captured guests to roll the "dice of death", with a life to be taken unless an improbable roll spares one of them.
22	2	"The Clowns Here Kill Part 2"	June 21, 2018
Rescued from the clowns, the guests learn the season's objective from a note bearing the Society Against Evil's symbol: the Carnival Master draws his power from eight artifacts hidden throughout Everlock, all of which must be found and cleansed before sunrise, or the town and everyone in it will die. Voted into the challenge: JC and Teala — the first vote of the season.: Each nominee chooses a partner to compete on their behalf while they are bound to spinning wheels; Matthew competes for JC.; Death Challenge: The partners race through the killer clowns' four carnival trials to save their bound players. Challenge Winner: Teala's side. Eliminated: JC Caylen (The Hippie) — stabbed by knives thrown by the killer clowns. Notes: The first artifact is cleansed, and a hidden note plants the season's paranoia: "Not everyone in town is telling the truth."
23	3	"Venomous Affections"	June 28, 2018
A flashback shows Cindy, a jilted woman of Everlock, transformed into the Snake Woman. The guests locate the next artifact, the Serpent's Eyes, and its guardian. Voted into the challenge: Nikita — joining Roi, who earned automatic nomination by toppling the tower in the Serpent's preliminary game. Death Challenge: The two search the innards of a serpent and race to complete their mosaics to claim its heart. Challenge Winner: Nikita, who warns the group that she is coming for whoever voted her in. Eliminated: Roi Fabito (The Daredevil) — poisoned and bitten by the Snake Woman. Notes: The second artifact is cleansed. The guests discover a box containing the Harp of Lazarus — an instrument that can raise the dead — sealed until two brass coins hidden in Everlock are earned through additional tasks. The slots on the box match the design on Joey's bag, drawing the group's suspicion toward him.
24	4	"The Man With No Name"	July 5, 2018
The guests find the next artifact and face its guardian: Benjamin, the Man with No Name, sent by the Carnival Master. Voted into the challenge: Rosanna and Teala. Death Challenge: Each nominee hunts letters of her assigned color in the dark to spell out the guardian's true name and retrieve the Blood Gem that cleanses the artifact. Challenge Winner: Rosanna, who returns with new resolve — "I'm a fighter." Eliminated: Teala Dunn (The Super Spy) — strangled by Benjamin. Notes: The third artifact is cleansed, but the group fails the side task and loses its chance at a Lazarus coin, leaving the resurrection box seemingly locked forever.
25	5	"Strong Like A Demon"	July 12, 2018
A flashback introduces the Strong Man, the carnival's brutal champion. Joey privately recognizes a church in Everlock from his time among the dead. Pressed by the group about his knowledge of Everlock, Joey confesses: he died, woke in the town, and signed a contract to save it in exchange for being brought back to life. Matthew answers that Joey is "willing to trade nine lives" for his own, and the group's trust in him collapses. Voted into the challenge: Manny and Matthew — the guardian demands two men. Death Challenge: The nominees compete to defeat the Strong Man and claim his title, retrieving the holy band of leather that cleanses the artifact. Challenge Winner: Manny — "the strongest man, full face of makeup." Eliminated: Matthew Patrick (The Detective) — beaten to death by the Strong Man. His last words urge the group to find the other Lazarus coin. Notes: The fourth artifact is cleansed, and the group secures the first of the two Lazarus coins, restoring hope that a fallen friend might be brought back.
26	6	"Twin Dolls"	July 19, 2018
With Joey's contract exposed, he tells the group that if the town is not saved, he dies with it. The guests confront the Twin Dolls and their instrument of death, the Maiden of Madness. Vote (direct-death vote, no challenge): To cleanse the artifact, the group must vote one of their own into the Maiden of Madness. Colleen is chosen, and pleads with her friends as she is sealed inside. Eliminated: Colleen Ballinger (The Disco Dancer) — trapped and impaled inside the Maiden of Madness. Notes: Joey recovers the second Lazarus coin, and the Lazarus box is opened at last. The surviving guests name the friend they wish to resurrect and strum the harp three times: Matthew is brought back from the dead, the first resurrection in the series.
27	7	"Funhouse"	July 26, 2018
A flashback shows Willy, a failing salesman, remade by the Carnival Master into the funhouse's four-headed caretaker. Entering the funhouse to cleanse the next artifact, the guests are captured; only Safiya and Rosanna escape. Voted into the challenge: Manny and Nikita — chosen by Safiya and Rosanna, the only guests free to vote. Death Challenge: The nominees are sent back into the funhouse — but the funhouse plays by different rules. Both competitors are told they will live; instead, the guest who voted for the challenge's winner will die. Challenge Winner: Nikita. Eliminated: Safiya Nygaard (The Investigative Reporter) — having voted for Nikita, she is stabbed with a fishhook by Willy, who pursues her into the group's supposedly safe lounge. This is the season's only elimination of a guest who was not competing in the challenge. Notes: The sixth artifact — a light bulb — is cleansed as the group fractures over Nikita's unapologetic self-preservation and Matthew's grief.
28	8	"Wicked Witches"	August 2, 2018
With the night nearing its end, three witches curse the guests one by one, and the Wickerman Doll can only be cleansed by breaking the curses laid on three citizens of Everlock — Sam, Maria, and Nolan. Cursed into the challenge: Joey, Manny, Matthew, and Rosanna — every guest cursed by the witches during the episode, with no vote taken. Death Challenge: The cursed guests drink a series of witches' brews and navigate the witches' tangled skein to retrieve the amulet of youth; the last to pass through becomes the witches' sacrifice. Eliminated: Rosanna Pansino (The Jet-Setter) — stabbed to death by the three witches after a tearful farewell with Joey. Notes: The seventh artifact is cleansed. With one artifact left, only three of the remaining four can escape.
29	9	"Control Issues"	August 9, 2018
The final artifact is guarded by Lucy, the Carnival Master's daughter, and her Demon Dog. Any guest Lucy touches has their name added to the vote, and the guests work to restrain her together. Meanwhile, Calliope confronts Mortimer, sensing that something is happening to him — the Psychedelic Swirl has begun to corrupt him. Voted into the challenge: Manny and Nikita, for the second time. Death Challenge: The nominees must beat Lucy at her own game: straitjacketed, they hunt a key in a pool of popcorn to free themselves and reach the box holding "salvation" — a pink gun the winner may turn on themselves or their opponent. Challenge Winner: Nikita, who shoots Manny, her close friend. Eliminated: Manny Mua (The Record Producer) — shot by Nikita. Notes: All eight artifacts are cleansed. But as the episode closes, the corrupted Mortimer makes his move — and the guests run.
30	10	"The Carnival Master"	August 15, 2018
Corrupted by the Psychedelic Swirl, Mortimer uses the cleansed artifacts to free the Carnival Master, who kills him for his service and then kills Calliope. Endgame: With the help of the Society Against Evil, Joey, Matthew, and Nikita turn the artifacts' power against the freed Carnival Master and defeat him, breaking his hold over Everlock as sunrise arrives. Joey is told that the spell has been broken and his contract is complete. Eliminated: None. Escaped: Joey Graceffa, Matthew Patrick, and Nikita Dragun, with Joey restored to life. Notes: Joey sends Matthew and Nikita on ahead, saying there is "one more thing" he has to do, and confides that what he wants most is "a way to make all the wrongs I did right". Jael of the Society Against Evil reveals that the Carnival Master held a crystal that can bring back those who have been lost, and the season closes on Rosanna's voice calling to Joey from beyond: "This is your chance to make things right. Please, we need you. Come save us."

== Awards and nominations ==
Award	Year	Category	Recipient(s) and nominee(s)	Result	Ref.
Shorty Awards	2018	Best Web Series	Escape the Night	Won	
Streamy Awards	2018	Best Comedy Series	Escape the Night	Nominated	
Streamy Awards	2018	Best Costume Design	Olivia Hines	Won	
Streamy Awards	2018	Best Ensemble Cast	Escape the Night	Nominated	
Streamy Awards	2018	Show of the Year	Escape the Night	Nominated	

== See also ==
- Murder in Small Town X
- The Murder Game
- Whodunnit?
- The Quest
