= Escape the Night =

American horror fantasy competition web series

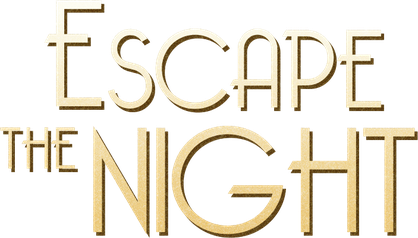
- Genre: Dark fantasy; Horror; Reality competition
- Created by: Joey Graceffa
- Written by: Adam Lawson (seasons 1–4)
- Directed by: Adam Lawson (seasons 1–4)
- Starring: Joey Graceffa
- Opening theme: "Evil House" by George Shaw
- Composer: George Shaw
- Country of origin: United States
- Original language: English
- No. of seasons: 4 (Note: Not including the 2025 miniseries The Lost Tapes.)
- No. of episodes: 43 (Note: Forty episodes across four seasons, plus the three episodes of The Lost Tapes.)

Production
- Executive producers: Brian Graden; LB Horschler; Catherine Keithley; Adam Lawson; Petar Mandich; Nancy Tamayo; Ari Weiner
- Producers: Joey Graceffa; Chris Grannon; Daniel Preda
- Cinematography: Cypress Sterling
- Editor: Steve Grubel
- Camera setup: Multi-camera
- Running time: 19–41 minutes
- Production company: Brian Graden Media

Original release
- Network: YouTube Red
- Release: June 22, 2016 – August 15, 2018
- Network: YouTube Premium
- Release: July 11 – September 4, 2019
- Network: Tubi
- Release: November 27, 2025

Escape the Night is an American horror fantasy competition web series created by Joey Graceffa. It premiered on YouTube Red (later renamed YouTube Premium) on June 22, 2016. In each installment, Graceffa and a cast of internet personalities attend a costumed dinner party and become trapped in a setting displaced from the present day, where they remain in character through a scripted storyline performed with actors, solving puzzles and voting one another into "death challenges" whose losers are written out in staged death scenes. The cast are not told the storyline's events in advance, and Graceffa has likened the format to live-action role-playing. The series awards no prize; the guests who survive each season are regarded as its winners.

The project was first announced by YouTube Red in October 2015 as a murder mystery series. Produced by Brian Graden Media, with Adam Lawson as writer and director, it ran for four seasons, concluding on September 4, 2019, and became the longest-running original series on YouTube Premium. It received six Streamy Awards nominations, winning two.

YouTube Premium declined to renew the series in 2020, and Graceffa retained ownership of the property. Following a 2023 crowdfunding campaign, the free streaming service Tubi added the four seasons to its platform and commissioned Escape the Night: The Lost Tapes, a three-episode miniseries announced as a "grand finale" for the franchise, which premiered on November 27, 2025.

== Synopsis ==
Graceffa appears as "The Savant", a fictionalized version of himself whose entanglement with supernatural forces traps him, and the friends he invites, in settings displaced from the present day: an estate that "only exists in the year 1920", a Victorian manor, the small town of Everlock frozen in time in the 1970s, (Note: Promotional material for the third season dates Everlock to 1978; the episodes refer only to "the 1970s".) a purgatorial Museum of the Dead, and, in The Lost Tapes, a 1980s video-rental store inside Pandora's Box. Each guest receives an invitation assigning an era-appropriate persona, such as the Journalist, the Detective, or the Prom Queen, and remains in costume and in character for the night.

Once inside, the group learns that escape requires recovering a season-specific set of objects before sunrise: four artifacts in the first season, followed by the release of the house's five former owners when the artifacts alone fail; eight gems held by the Sorceress's lieutenants in the second; eight corrupted artifacts that must be cleansed in the third; and nine jeweled keys to a sealed vault in the fourth. Each object is guarded by a monstrous adversary and locked behind puzzles, clues, and physical tasks.

Recovering the objects carries a recurring price. In most episodes, the guests vote two of their own into a "death challenge", a head-to-head contest whose loser is killed off in a staged sequence. The series offers no prize; "winning" a season means surviving the night. Each of the four seasons ends with two guests surviving, alongside Graceffa in every season but the second; Graceffa has said the production intended each season to end with two survivors.

The series maintains serialized continuity across installments. Guests killed in one season can return in later ones, and the fourth season's cast is drawn largely from previous seasons' dead, competing for resurrection. Graceffa's character follows a continuing arc: he escapes the first season marked by the evil, dies at the end of the second, is restored to life over the third under a contract he conceals from his guests, and vanishes into Pandora's Box at the end of the fourth. The Lost Tapes continues the arc to an ending Graceffa has said he deliberately left open to interpretation.

== Format ==
Episodes generally open with a recap and a scripted sequence introducing the episode's adversary, often set in the story's past. The group then gains access to a new area of the setting, uncovers lore through notes and journals, often attributed to the Society Against Evil, and completes puzzles and tasks tied to the episode's adversary, the guardian of that episode's object. Challenge rules are delivered as in-story notes. The episode culminates in a vote that sends two guests into a death challenge; the survivor usually returns with, or unlocks, the object, whose recovery or cleansing opens the path to the next area. In the third season, this progression is shown on a map of Everlock on which new locations appear each time an artifact is cleansed.

Voting uses a pool-and-draw system rather than a majority. Each guest casts a vote, on slips drawn from a hat in the first season and on name cards shuffled and drawn in later seasons, and an in-story character played by an actor draws the names of the guests who enter the challenge. Because names are drawn from the pool rather than tallied, a guest who receives a single vote can be selected, a mechanic that shapes the cast's strategic discussions. Later seasons add further routes into the pool: in one third-season episode, guests touched by the episode's monster had their names added to the vote, and in the fourth season, guests who made mistakes in certain tasks had their cards placed in the voting pile. Some episodes bypass the vote entirely, selecting guests through performance, as in a fourth-season task in which the two guests with the fewest coins entered the challenge; through gender-restricted votes; or through twists that spare both contestants or penalize the guest who cast a vote.

The death challenge itself is usually a head-to-head contest, such as a race to complete a task, solve a puzzle, or survive an encounter, in which the loser is "killed" in character and removed from the game. Eliminated guests are written out through staged kill sequences performed with the season's monsters and villains, and these deaths are treated as canon within the franchise's continuity. Some episodes alter the structure with team-based or group challenges, and deaths also occur outside the format, most notably Graceffa's own death in the second-season finale.

The settings are populated by in-story characters portrayed by actors, such as household staff in the first season and Everlock townspeople such as Calliope and Mortimer in the third, who guide, assist, and occasionally betray the group; the first season's head of staff, Arthur, is ultimately revealed to be in league with the evil controlling the house. Each season's primary antagonist commands subordinate monsters and lieutenants, each typically guarding one of the season's objects and serving as the focus of a single episode.

Deaths in the series are not always permanent. The third season's guests use a "Lazarus harp" to return Matthew Patrick to the game, and a wish granted in the fourth season returns Colleen Ballinger mid-season; the fourth season's premise is itself built on resurrection. Recurring story elements include the Society Against Evil, a secret order dedicated to fighting dark forces, and the Cursed God, a malevolent entity invoked in several seasons and linked to a number of the franchise's antagonists.

== Production ==
=== Concept ===
In October 2015, YouTube Red revealed upcoming projects including an untitled Joey Graceffa project involving a murder mystery. In May 2016, the service teased clips of the series. Graceffa told Teen Vogue that the idea had been in the works for two years and that he most looked forward to collaborating with other YouTubers. He also said the series was inspired by a murder-mystery episode of Lizzie McGuire and was closely related to the film Clue (1985).

According to Lawson, Graceffa pitched a period murder-mystery show, and Lawson proposed making it "dark and violent", set in the 1920s with a narrative element and scripted pieces. The pair cast YouTube creators rather than actors or conventional reality-television participants.

=== Filming ===
Graceffa described filming the first season as "super-intense", with shoots running from 10 p.m. to 6 a.m. over five consecutive nights in the Los Angeles area, two episodes each night.

Production was divided into two phases: a live phase, filmed without retakes and making up the majority of each episode, and a separate scripted shoot for narrative sequences. Lawson described crew days running from around noon to 7 a.m., including four to six hours spent rigging each episode's clues and compartments before the cast arrived. The first season's roughly 160 clues and puzzles were developed with designers from Enigma Escape Room and built by production designer Geoff Flint's team. Actors playing in-story characters wore earpieces through which Lawson could direct them, and improvised in character when the cast asked questions they had no scripted answer for.

=== Scripted and unscripted elements ===
The series combines a scripted storyline, performed by actors, with unscripted gameplay by a cast who are not told the story's events in advance. Graceffa co-developed each season's storyline with Lawson but was not told its clues, puzzle solutions, or plot twists, so that he could play alongside the cast. Graceffa has described the cast's performances as "all just improv" and the format as "basically live action role playing". Variety has described the series as "semi-scripted".

Most votes and death challenges were decided by their outcomes, but Graceffa has said that some eliminations were arranged in advance to accommodate cast availability, injury, or other production needs. He has cited Shane Dawson's death in the first episode, which he said was planned because Dawson was available for only one night, with that episode's riddle set so that it could not be solved in the time allotted; the first-season exits of GloZell Green and iJustine; Liza Koshy's death in the second season; and a double elimination in the fourth season. Graceffa has also said that his own death in the second-season finale was decided the night before filming, and that The Lost Tapes was designed from the outset with no intended survivors.

=== Distribution ===
Two episodes of the first season premiered on June 22, 2016, through YouTube Red. The series was renewed for a second season in October 2016, which premiered on June 22, 2017. Graceffa confirmed a third season in May 2018, and the third season premiered on June 21, 2018. With the fourth season renewed, it became the longest-running original series on YouTube. The fourth season premiered at VidCon during a panel with Graceffa and was also available to watch for free on YouTube on July 11, 2019. According to Variety, the four seasons had accumulated more than two billion views by 2025. As of November 2025, the full series is available on Tubi.

== Episodes ==
Season	Contestants	Episodes	Originally released			Winners
Season	Contestants	Episodes	First released	Last released	Network	Winners
1	11	10	June 22, 2016	August 17, 2016	YouTube Red	Eva Gutowski & Oli White
2	10	10	June 22, 2017	August 16, 2017	YouTube Red	Andrea Russett & Tyler Oakley
3	10	10	June 21, 2018	August 15, 2018	YouTube Red	Matthew Patrick & Nikita Dragun
4	10	10	July 11, 2019	September 4, 2019	YouTube Premium	Bretman Rock & Colleen Ballinger
TLT	6	3	November 27, 2025		Tubi	— (Note: No survivors are designated. Graceffa has said the miniseries was designed with no intended survivors, while describing the fates of Nikita Dragun and Manny MUA as "up to interpretation".)

== Controversy ==
On June 27, 2021, former contestant Gabbie Hanna released a video criticizing producer Daniel Preda, Graceffa, and the show's creative team, in which she alleged that mistreatment on set, including production's handling of her meal requests, had triggered her eating disorder. Preda denied the allegations and said that Hanna had "missed or delayed production obligations" and was "verbally abusive" to staff. Several fourth-season cast members sided with the production, with one saying Hanna's account "paints an untruthful picture of what happened".

== Cancellation and miniseries ==
YouTube Premium declined to renew the series for a fifth season. In June 2020, Graceffa said the service would no longer fund further seasons and that he retained full ownership of the intellectual property.

In October 2023, Graceffa released teasers for a new project through the series' social media accounts, and on November 2, 2023, he launched an Indiegogo campaign to fund a film continuation. In November 2023, Graceffa brought five previous contestants, Manny Mua, GloZell Green, Tyler Oakley, Teala Dunn, and Rosanna Pansino, to compete for a role in the project, which Pansino won. Mua was also cast in the resulting miniseries.

Graceffa later said that the production had hoped to raise a million dollars to make a film, but that the campaign raised about $130,000, enough to fund a single episode; the footage captured was then expanded into three parts. Lawson did not return; Graceffa said Lawson left the project about five months before filming.

On November 12, 2025, Tubi announced Escape the Night: The Lost Tapes as part of its first slate of creator-led series. On November 18, 2025, Graceffa announced on X that the miniseries would premiere on November 27.

== Other media ==
=== Escape room ===
With the release of the fourth season, an immersive escape room was set up for a limited event that ran from August 9 to August 27, 2019, in Beverly Hills, California. The escape room had multiple rooms, with surprise appearances from Joey Graceffa, Jack O'Connor as Mortimer, and Eva Augustina Sinotte as the Sorceress.

=== Board game ===
In June 2020, Graceffa announced that due to COVID-19's impact on Hollywood and television, a fifth installment was postponed indefinitely, and teased a new interactive fan project. A Kickstarter campaign to fund a board game based on the series reached its goal of $30,000 in three hours, and the game was formally announced the next day.

== Accolades ==
Name of the award ceremony, year presented, category, nominee(s) of the award, and the result of the nomination
Award	Year (Note: Indicates the year of ceremony. Each year is linked to the article about the awards held that year, wherever possible.)	Category	Recipient(s) and nominee(s)	Result	Ref.
Streamy Awards	2016	Best Costume Design	Olivia Hines	Nominated	
Streamy Awards	2016	Best Ensemble Cast	Escape the Night	Won	
Streamy Awards	2018	Best Comedy Series	Escape the Night	Nominated	
Streamy Awards	2018	Best Costume Design	Olivia Hines	Won	
Streamy Awards	2018	Best Ensemble Cast	Escape the Night	Nominated	
Streamy Awards	2018	Show of the Year	Escape the Night	Nominated	
Shorty Awards	2018	Best Website Series	Escape the Night	Won	
