= Manny MUA =

American YouTuber and make-up artist

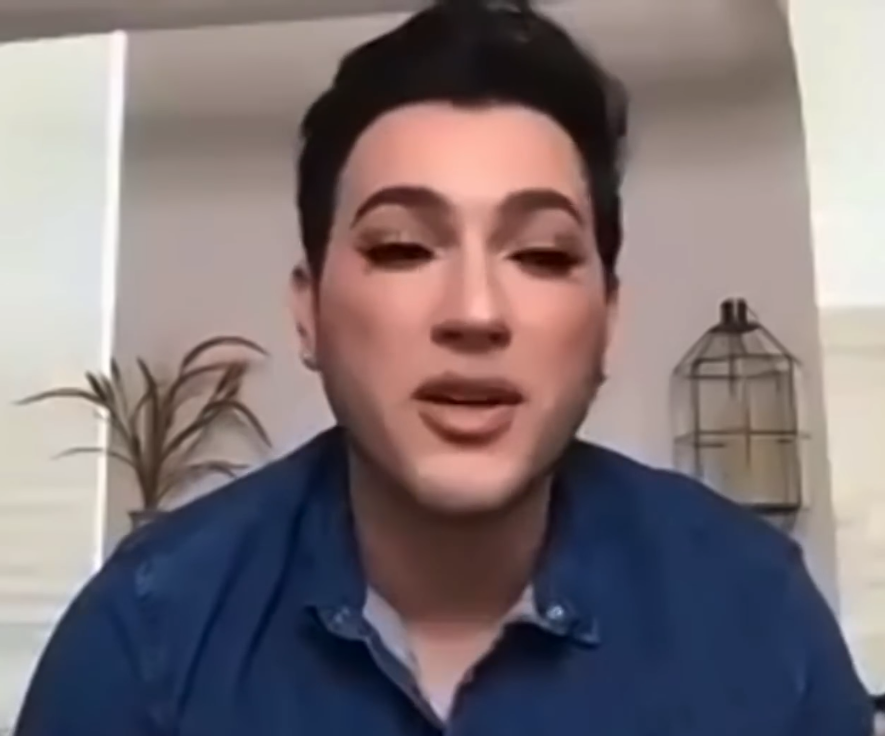
- Gutierrez during the virtual presidential town hall about vaccine hesitancy in 2021
- Born: Manuel Gutierrez Jr. April 4, 1991 (age 35); San Diego, California, U.S.
- Education: San Diego State University
- Occupations: YouTuber; Make-up artist; Entrepreneur

YouTube information
- Channel: Manny Mua
- Subscribers: 4.85 million
- Views: 563 million
- Last updated: January 2022

Manuel Gutierrez Jr. (born April 4, 1991), known professionally as Manny MUA, is an American make-up artist, YouTuber, entrepreneur, and beauty blogger. In 2017, he was the first male brand ambassador in a campaign for the "Big Shot" mascara of the make-up brand Maybelline. In 2018, he founded his own cosmetics company called Lunar Beauty and launched his own cosmetic products.

== Career ==
Gutierrez told Teen Vogue that he first became interested in make-up during childhood while watching his mother do her make-up. He later worked at Sephora and MAC. He began his YouTube channel in 2014. He regularly posts make-up tutorials, make-up first impressions, and beauty tips. He has collaborated with Makeup Geek on an eye-shadow palette, Morphe Cosmetics on an eye-shadow palette, OFRA Cosmetics on lip products, and Jeffree Star Cosmetics on highlighters and lipsticks.

In 2017, Gutierrez and fellow YouTuber Shayla Mitchell were announced as brand ambassadors for Maybelline, specifically Colossal Big Shot Mascara. He is the second male to be chosen as a spokesperson for a beauty brand after James Charles who had been previously announced as a spokesperson for CoverGirl in October 2016. Later that year, Gutierrez and Jeffree Star announced a collaboration for Star's make-up brand to debut in April. After the announcement, Black Moon Cosmetics sued Gutierrez and Star for copyright and trademark infringement, alleging that they had copied their logo without permission. The lawsuit was later resolved. In April 2017, Gutierrez was the only male to make People magazine's annual "Most Beautiful" list. In 2018, he was named to Forbes' annual list of "30 under 30" in the Arts and Style category. In 2018, Manny appeared in season three of Escape the Night as the Record Producer.

In 2018, Gutierrez started his makeup line called Lunar Beauty and launched the brand's first eye shadow palette, Life's a Drag. The palette includes 14 shades of bright and neutral eye shadow colors.

In 2021, Gutierrez asked Joe Biden and Anthony Fauci questions during a virtual presidential town hall about vaccine hesitancy.

== Filmography ==
- Escape the Night (2018)
- The Surreal Life (2022)
- Escape the Night: The Lost Tapes (2025)

== Personal life ==
Gutierrez grew up in a Mormon family and has two younger brothers. He is Mexican-American. Before deciding on a career in beauty, Gutierrez planned to attend medical school with aspirations of becoming a plastic surgeon. He has a Bachelor's degree from San Diego State University.
