= Nikita Dragun =

American internet personality (born 1996)

Nikita Nguyen
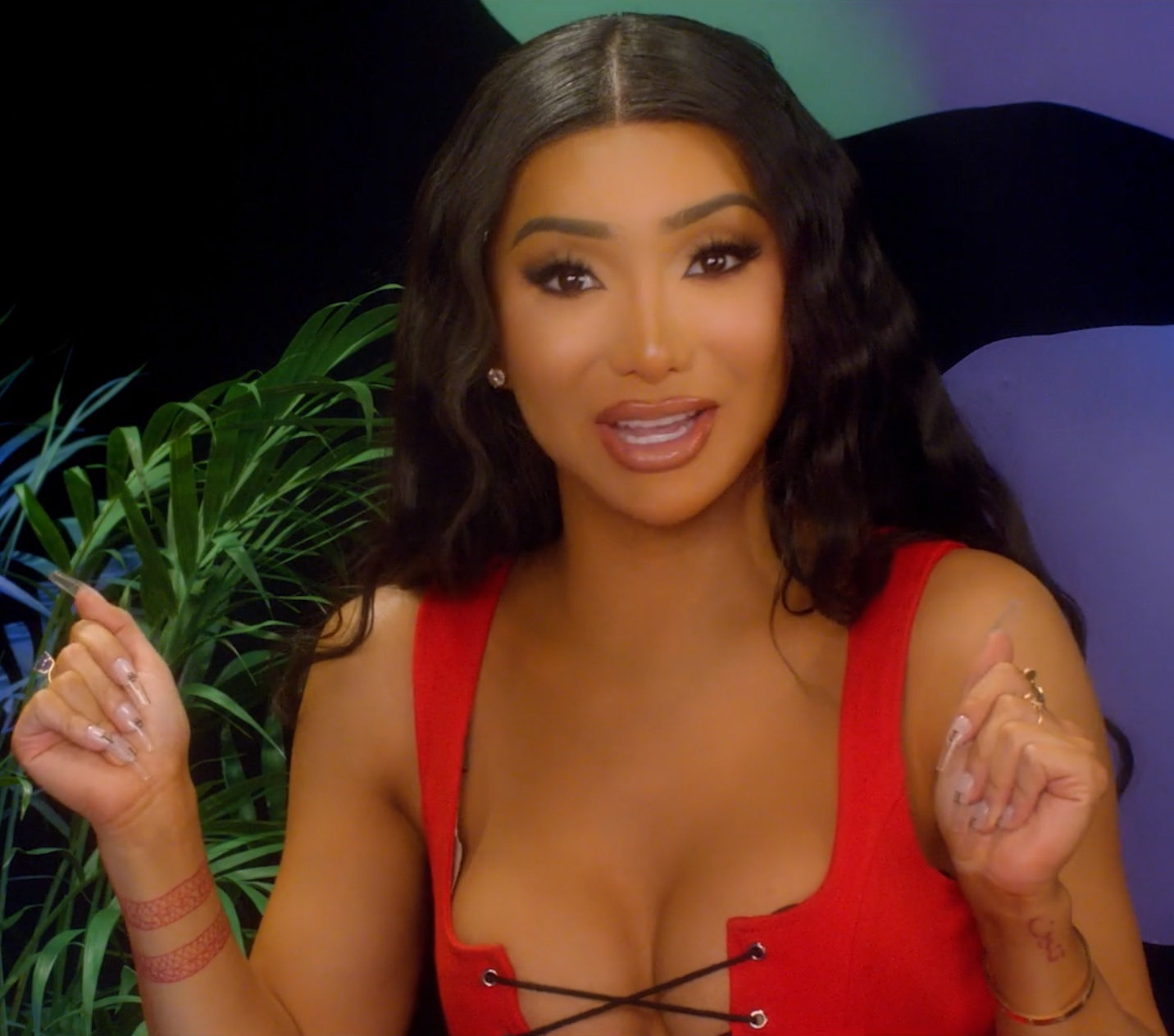
- Nguyen in 2019
- Born: January 31, 1996 (age 30); Belgium
- Years active: 2014–2022, 2024–present

YouTube information
- Channel: NikitaDragun
- Genres: Beauty, vlog, makeup
- Subscribers: 3.32 million
- Views: 234 million
- Last updated: March 7, 2026

Nikita Nguyen (born January 31, 1996), known professionally as Nikita Dragun, is an American internet personality, YouTuber, make-up artist, and model.

== Early life and education ==
Nguyen was born on January 31, 1996 in Belgium and raised in Springfield, Virginia, United States.

She is of Vietnamese and Mexican descent. She is a trans woman and began her gender transition while in college, choosing the name Nikita based on the television series of the same name.

== Career ==
Nguyen joined YouTube in February 2013. She stated, "I started to get little brand deals around that time… That was also when I decided to start taking Instagram and YouTube seriously." She later relocated to Los Angeles, where, in 2015, she came out as transgender. As of May 2023, she has 3.5 million subscribers on YouTube, 9 million followers on Instagram, and 14.5 million followers on TikTok.

In response to comments by L Brands chief marketing officer Ed Razek that trans women should not be included in the Victoria's Secret Fashion Show because "the show is a fantasy", Nguyen tweeted a video of herself modeling lingerie. In the tweet, Nguyen argues that trans women were indeed able to convey fantasy.

In March 2019, she announced a make-up line, Dragun Beauty. Aside from the mainstream market, the cosmetic line is also targeted towards the transgender community. All products are vegan and cruelty-free; this is cited as a reason why Nikita decided to launch her brand independently. In June 2019, Nguyen was interviewed about her make-up brand on the LGBT radio network Channel Q, where she credited her journey as a trans woman building her brand as the inspiration behind Dragun Beauty and its products.

In September 2019, it was announced Nikita would be starring in her own docuseries on Snapchat, "Nikita Unfiltered". The series follows Nguyen as she searches for love, "a different path" in her career, and navigates fame as a trans woman. The series premiered on March 21, 2020.

== Controversies ==
A 2017 photo shoot in which Nguyen appeared in heavy bronzer led some on Twitter to accuse her of blackface or blackfishing.

On July 21, 2020, Nguyen held a surprise birthday party for YouTuber Larri Merritt during the COVID-19 pandemic at the Hype House mansion. The party included internet celebrities such as James Charles, Charli D'Amelio, Dixie D'Amelio, and others. At the time of the party, California's COVID-19 cases had just surpassed New York's cases. An estimated 67 people were in attendance, many of whom were seen without face masks despite local health recommendations. Photos and videos of the event appeared on social media sites such as Instagram. These posts drew criticism from the public, including other influencers like Elijah Daniel and Tyler Oakley. Merritt and some of the other attendees later apologized. Residents of the Hype House later tested negative for COVID-19.

=== Arrest ===
Nguyen was arrested on November 7, 2022, after police claimed they found her roaming around a swimming pool at The Goodtime Hotel in Miami Beach, Florida, wearing only underwear and spraying police and security personnel with water. According to the police report, officers were called in response to a report of a person acting in a "highly disorderly fashion" and causing a disturbance. She was charged for misdemeanor disorderly conduct, misdemeanor battery, and felony battery on a police officer. Nguyen was taken into custody at the Turner Guilford Knight Correctional Center in Miami-Dade County with a $2,000 bond. She claimed she was placed into a men's prison despite her gender identity.

Officials from the Miami-Dade Corrections and Rehabilitation Department disputed Nguyen's account, saying during Nguyen's booking process she was first held in an open seating area, then in a one-person holding cell.

== Filmography ==
=== Web series ===
| Year | Title | Role | Notes | Ref. |
|---|---|---|---|---|
| 2018–2019 | Escape the Night | The Troublemaker | Main cast; 14 episodes | |
| 2020 | Nikita Unfiltered | Herself | 10 episodes | |
| 2020 | Instant Influencer | Herself | Episode: "I Have to Apologize for This..." | |

=== TV series ===
| Year | Title | Role | Notes | Ref. |
|---|---|---|---|---|
| 2019 | The Real Housewives of Beverly Hills | Herself | Episode: "The Show Must Go On" | |
| 2022 | Hype House | Herself | Main role | |
| 2025 | Escape the Night: The Lost Tapes | The Glam Rocker | | |

=== Music videos ===
| Year | Title | Performer(s) | Ref. |
|---|---|---|---|
| 2018 | "Heart to Break" | Kim Petras | |
| 2018 | "That Bih" | Qveen Herby | |
| 2019 | "Best Friend's Ass" | Dimitri Vegas & Like Mike, Paris Hilton | |
| 2019 | "Fuck It Up" | Iggy Azalea, Kash Doll | |
| 2020 | "Malibu" (At Home Edition) | Kim Petras | |
| 2020 | "Baby, I'm Jealous" | Bebe Rexha, Doja Cat | |
| 2020 | "Canceled" | Larray | |
| 2022 | "Booty" | Saucy Santana, Latto | |

== Awards and nominations ==
| Year | Award | Category | Work | Result | Ref. |
|---|---|---|---|---|---|
| 2019 | Streamy Awards | Beauty | Herself | Won | |
| 2019 | People's Choice Awards | The Beauty Influencer of 2019 | Herself | Nominated | |
| 2019 | American Influencer Awards | Makeup Influencer Of The Year | Herself | Nominated | |
| 2019 | American Influencer Awards | Modelland Smize Award | Herself | Won | |
| 2020 | Shorty Awards | Best in Beauty | Herself | Won | |
| 2020 | People's Choice Awards | The Beauty Influencer of 2020 | Herself | Nominated | |
| 2020 | Streamy Awards | Show of the Year | Nikita Unfiltered | Nominated | |
| 2020 | Streamy Awards | Documentary | Nikita Unfiltered | Nominated | |
| 2020 | Streamy Awards | Creator Product | Dragun Beauty | Nominated | |
| 2021 | Streamy Awards | Show of the Year | Nikita Unfiltered | Nominated | |
| 2021 | Streamy Awards | Unscripted Series | Nikita Unfiltered | Nominated | |
| 2022 | Streamy Awards | Fashion & Style | Herself | Nominated | |
