= Expedition Africa =

- Genre: Reality; Documentary
- Starring: Pasquale Scatturo; Mireya Mayor; Benedict Allen; Kevin Sites
- Country of origin: United States
- Original language: English
- No. of seasons: 1
- No. of episodes: 8

Production
- Executive producer: Mark Burnett
- Running time: 45 minutes

Original release
- Network: History
- Release: May 31 – July 12, 2009

Expedition Africa is an eight-part reality television miniseries that originally aired from May 31, 2009 to July 12, 2009 on History. Produced by Mark Burnett, the program follows four modern day explorers—a navigator, a wildlife expert, a survivalist, and a journalist—as they substantially retrace H.M. Stanley's famed expedition to find Dr. David Livingstone. Their route deviates somewhat from Stanley's in that it includes a treacherous crossing of the Uluguru Mountains, which Stanley circumvented. Additionally, whereas Stanley took roughly 8 months to find Livingstone, the explorers on the show have 30 days to complete the 970-mile journey deep into the interior of Tanzania.

== Cast ==
So far, the cast consisted of four members (listed in alphabetical order below).

- Benedict Allen is an explorer, author, and filmmaker. Benedict's adventures have taken him from Siberia to South America, where he once completed an eight-month journey to become the first outsider ever to cross the Amazon basin at its widest point. Nevertheless, he does not have much experience in Africa. The author of 10 books, Benedict serves as the group's survivalist. Benedict often chafes under Pasquale's leadership.
- Mireya Mayor is an anthropologist, wildlife correspondent, and former cheerleader for the NFL's Miami Dolphins. Mireya, who has a PhD and master's degree in anthropology, is a two-time Emmy Award-nominated correspondent for the National Geographic Channel. Her work has provided her with extensive field experience studying primates, snakes, and other wild animals indigenous to the continent. Mireya is sometimes annoyed by what she perceives as Pasquale's condescending treatment towards the only woman in the group, as well as by Kevin's inexperience.
- Pasquale Scatturo is an adventurer and geophysicist who has led expeditions all over the world, including three to Mount Everest. Pasquale once successfully led a dangerous 3,260 mile expedition from the source of the Nile River high in the mountains of Ethiopia to the Mediterranean Sea, an experience which was captured in the IMAX film, Mystery of the Nile. Pasquale serves as the group's navigator and de facto leader, though his perceived domineering manner sometimes creates conflict with other members.
- Kevin Sites is a war correspondent and author who has worked for ABC, NBC and CNN. As a backpack journalist, he covered every major conflict in the world in one year for Yahoo! News. On the series he's depicted as a motivated but inexperienced explorer. He's often seen advocating on behalf of the porters, but some in the group regard this sensitivity as him transposing his own concerns onto others. Sites also performs as a trained EMT, helping out where needed medically, and sometimes comes into conflict with Mireya, who believes her past expedition experiences outweigh Sites' "book" knowledge.

== Episodes ==
Episode 1: Lost in Africa

Episode 2: First Victim

Episode 3: Hunters Become The Hunted

Episode 4: African Monsoon

Episode 5: Danger In the Desert

Episode 6: Malaria Claims an Explorer

Episode 7: Heart of Darkness

Episode 8: The Final Chapter
