= IJustine =

American YouTuber (born 1984)

iJustine
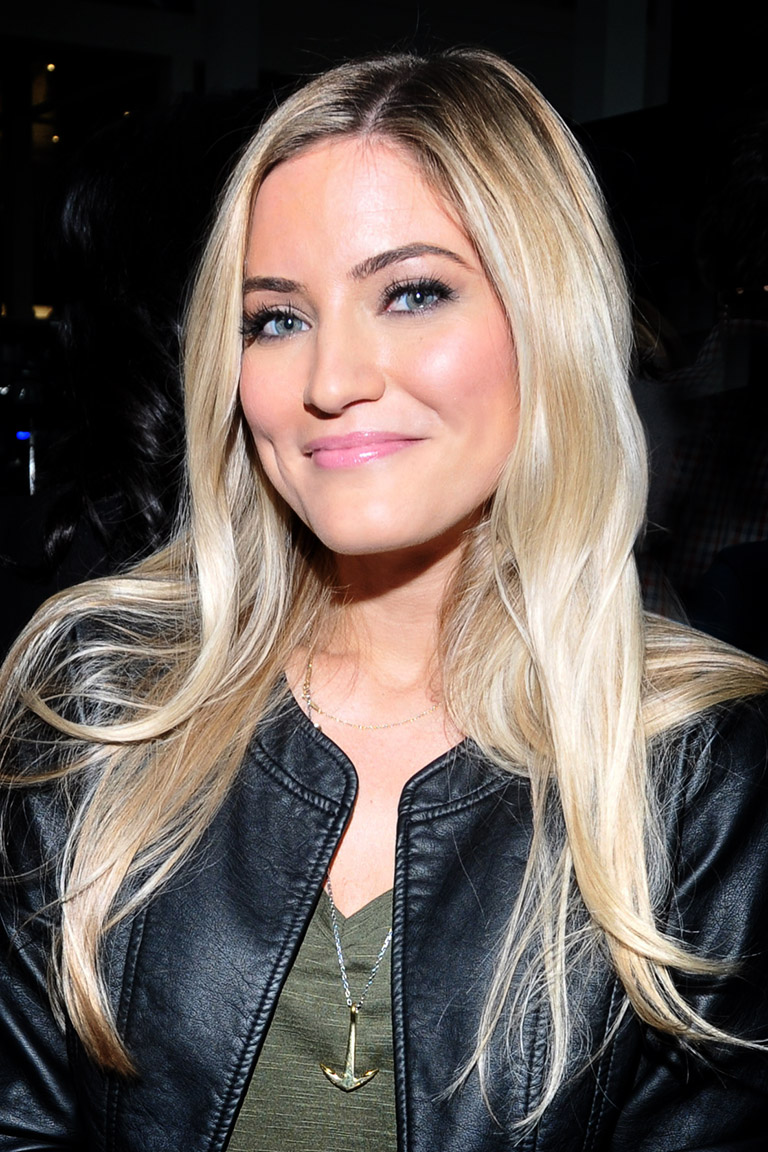
- iJustine in 2015
- Born: Justine Ezarik; March 20, 1984 (age 42); Pittsburgh, Pennsylvania, U.S.
- Education: Pittsburgh Technical Institute
- Occupation: YouTuber
- Years active: 2006–present
- Known for: 300-page iPhone bill

Instagram information
- Page: iJustine
- Followers: 1.6 million (May 12, 2025)

TikTok information
- Page: iJustine
- Followers: 1.6 million

YouTube information
- Channel: iJustine
- Genres: Vlogging; gaming; lifestyle; Tech
- Subscribers: 7.1 million
- Views: 1.54 billion
- Website: ijustine.com

Justine Ezarik (/iːˈzɛər.ɪk/ ee-ZAIR-ik; born March 20, 1984) is an American YouTuber. She is best known as iJustine, with over one billion views on her YouTube channel. She gained attention as a lifecaster who communicated directly with her millions of viewers on her Justin.tv channel, ijustine.tv. She acquired notability in roles variously described as a "lifecasting star," a "new media star," or one of the Internet's most popular lifecasters. She posts videos on her main channel iJustine.

Ezarik was known for her "300-page iPhone bill" which followed the first month of service after the introduction of the first iPhone in 2007. The viral video of her review earned her international attention. Ezarik was ranked among the top 1000 Twitter users in the world with over 1.8 million followers. Ezarik had starred on the YouTube comedy series Annoying Orange, as Orange's love interest Passion Fruit. In 2016, she was an advisor to Arnold Schwarzenegger on the reality competition series The New Celebrity Apprentice. Her television acting credits include guest appearances on Law & Order: Special Victims Unit, Criminal Minds, The Bold and the Beautiful and The Vampire Diaries. Ezarik also appeared as a main character on the first and fourth seasons of the YouTube Premium murder-mystery reality series Escape the Night.

== Early life ==
Justine Ezarik was born in Pittsburgh, Pennsylvania, the oldest daughter of Michelle Ezarik, a physical education teacher, and Steve Ezarik, a coal miner of Slovak descent. She attended Bentworth High School, in Washington County, Pennsylvania, graduating in 2002. Ezarik has two younger sisters, Breanne and Jenna.

== Career ==
=== Early career ===
After graduating from the Pittsburgh Technical Institute in 2004, Ezarik landed several jobs in graphic design and video editing before starting her own business. In December 2006, she was named one of five finalists in the "Yahoo! Talent Show", a Yahoo!-sponsored competition for best online videos.

She played a photojournalist covering a bank robbery in downtown Pittsburgh on the television series The Kill Point from Spike TV, which starred John Leguizamo and Donnie Wahlberg; it was filmed in May 2007. In 2007, she was an occasional co-host and panel member on MacBreak and MacBreak Weekly with Leo Laporte.

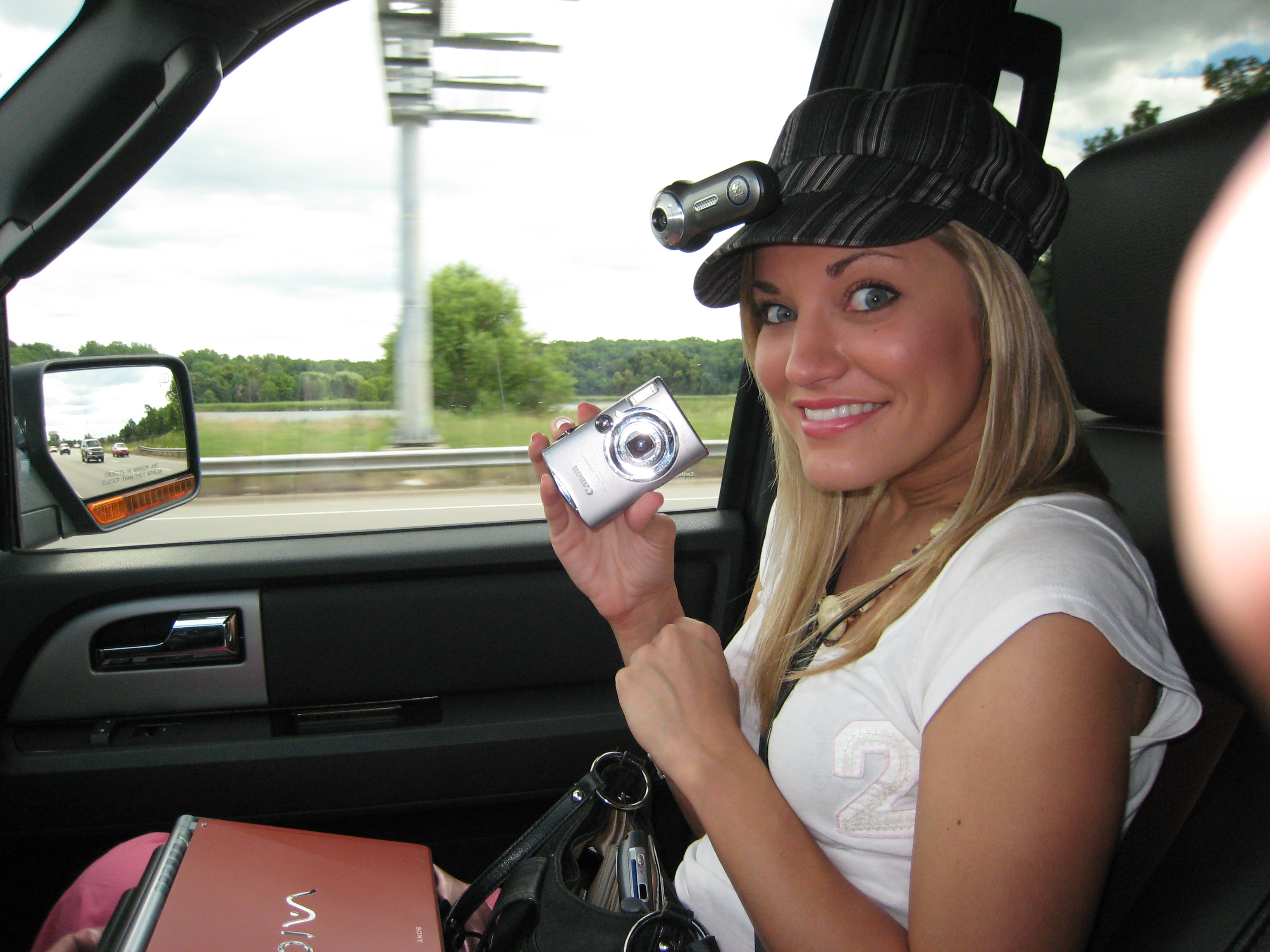
iJustine in a car with lifecasting equipment

Ezarik appeared live on the Internet through the use of a wireless webcam and microphone on her own iJustine lifecasting channel on Justin Kan's Justin.tv, where she began transmitting her life via the Internet on May 29, 2007. She was never paid for any of this volunteer work on Kan's channel as a beta-tester.

Her reality-video blog (vlog) was the first one launched on Justin.tv. Kan had been encouraged by fans and followers to allow someone else to make a guest appearance on his lifecasting channel.

At first Ezarik was considering producing a video series for the technology audience because they had been the most captive audience for online video series. She stated that she did not intend to broadcast what she considers private moments, noting "That shouldn't be a problem. I am going to try as much as I can to do 24/7."

When the iPhone debuted in June 2007, Ezarik covered the device's debut at the Mall of America in Bloomington, Minnesota a suburb south of Minneapolis. She had been invited by a technology evangelist to film her Internet TV show at the mall instead of covering its debut at the Shadyside Apple store as she had originally planned.

She covered the July 22, 2007, "The Kill Point" series premiere party live on her lifecast video stream. Ezarik was cited as being one of the website's most popular lifecasters in the October 2007 issues of both The New York Times and The Wall Street Journal.

=== Viral video career and Internet celebrity status ===
Ezarik was also featured in the August 28, 2007 weekly installment of Kevin Sites' People of the Web series on Yahoo! News along with Justin Kan, the creator of Justin.TV. Sites said she was "the star of this network so far," and said "she has model good looks and easy cyber savvyness that attracts both technophiles and casual users alike." The final cut of the interview video included footage from the live web cast of the interview showing Ezarik's webcam viewpoint. When Sites asked her to turn off her lifecasting equipment later in the interview, he noted that "at once the conversation seemed more relaxed and natural," and she discussed the difficulty of having people watching and publicly judging her all day.

In early September 2007, she was featured as the lead story on the Yahoo! homepage which boosted her ratings to as many as 4,000 viewers at any given moment. As of late September 2007, she was living in Pittsburgh and held a position as spokesperson for Pittsburgh Councilman Bill Peduto. She also landed a job with Xtrain which was a firm that specialized in new media expert training. Although her father remained supportive, her friends were beginning to tire of the intrusive nature of her activities by the end of 2007. In October 2007, she was described as one of the web's most popular lifecasters in Tribune Company affiliates such as the Chicago Tribune. That fall, she was a featured participant in the first annual BlogWorld & New Media Expo which bills itself as the "World's Largest Social Media Conference".

By April 2008, Ezarik had largely reduced her lifecasting productions to a less frequent basis. She had resumed pursuit of her web designer and video editor career and was living in Carnegie. Her new equipment by Nokia enabled her to lifecast and produce streaming video live without a computer connection. She continued to make weekly appearances on her own iJustine website at www.ijustine.tv. Still a Carnegie resident at the time, Ezarik planned to be vacationing in North Carolina when the iPhone 3G was released in July 2008 and hoped to find an AT&T wireless store to upgrade her phone while on vacation. That June Ezarik was named by Intel and its PR firm Ogilvy & Mather to a 10-member social media strategy advisory board. In late 2008, she relocated her base of operation from Pittsburgh to Los Angeles.

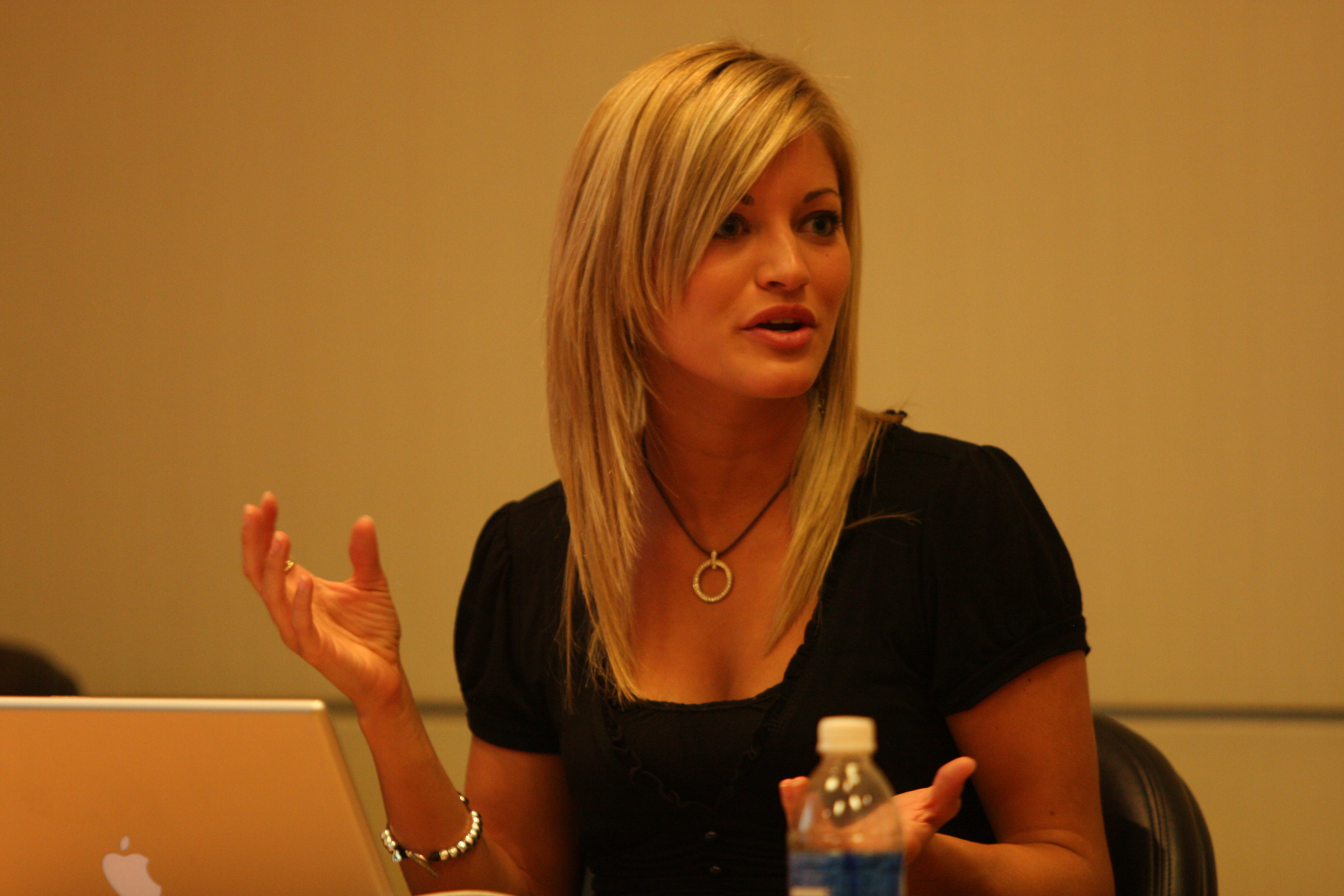
iJustine involved in discussions at the Intel insider event where she served on Intel's social media strategy advisory board in May 2008

Ezarik posted a video about wanting to order a cheeseburger on YouTube. It got 600,000 views in its first week. Ezarik has come to view iJustine as a character. As a result, she does not curse or drink alcohol on any videos she releases. By January 2009 she had reduced her lifecasting by a few hours a week, and by April 2009 her lifecast channel fell silent. When Ezarik first moved to Los Angeles, she was managed by Richard Frias who also managed YouTube celebrities HappySlip and KevJumba, but according to a post on Ezarik's alternate Twitter account she was unmanaged and earned money by appearing at conferences and in online promotional spots. At the time, she believed that her fanbase was predominantly between the ages of 11 and 18.

In October 2008, she became the host of an online, twice weekly music and lifestyle program produced by PluggedIn.com called The PluggedIn 5.

In 2008, she lived in an apartment in Los Angeles. She has a series of advertisements by the name of "Lost in America" appearing on AT&T's website. The series of ads, which features herself and Karen Nguyen who is a well-known blogger, has not been viewed as successful in the advertising industry. The series has Ezarik and Nguyen getting lost in various locales and solving their problems using AT&T equipment. After the first eleven episodes over the course of two weeks in November 2008, the series only registered a total of 31,000 views according to Tubemogul.

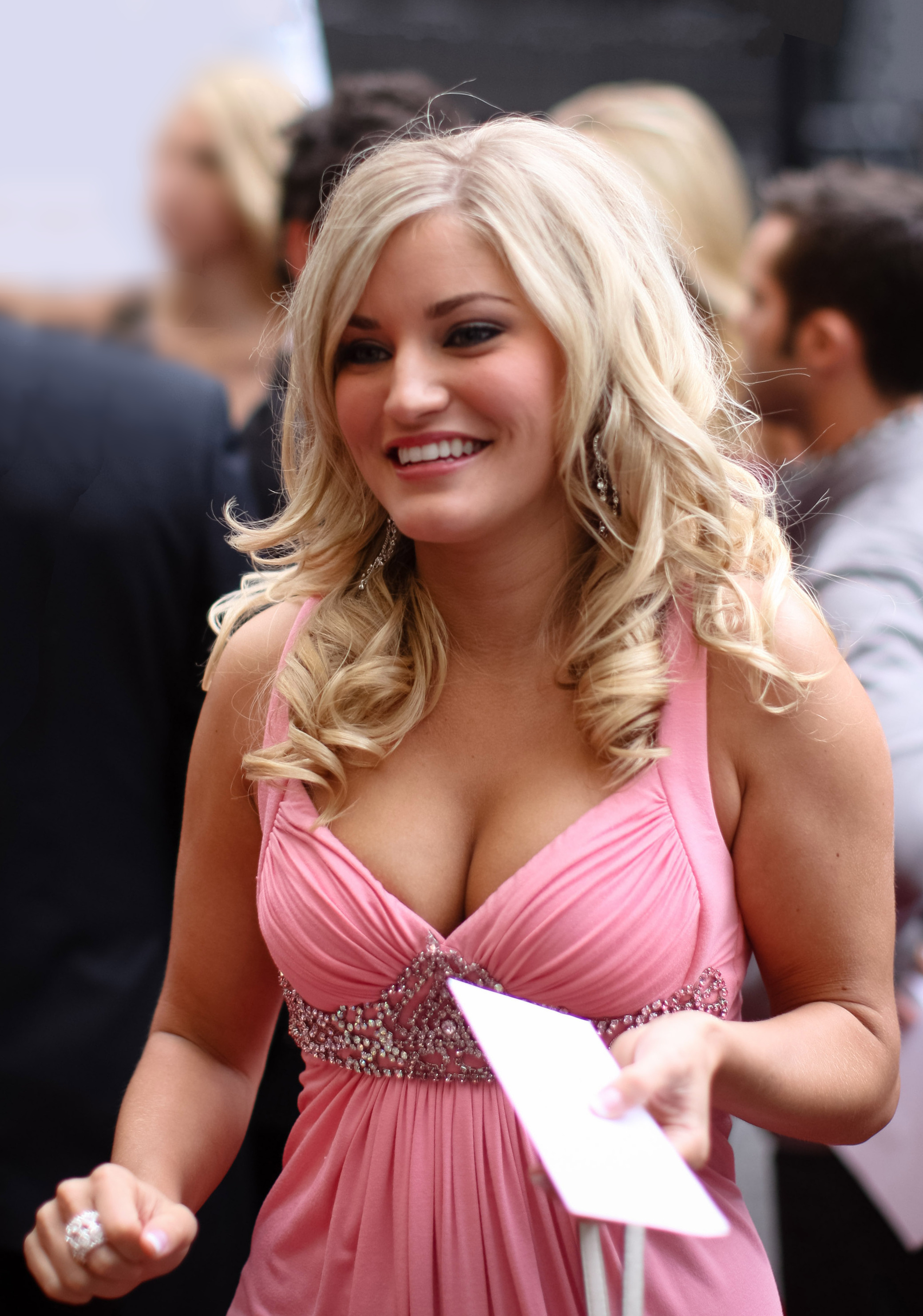
iJustine in 2010

Ezarik was also hired to appear in three commercials for a national TV ad campaign for Mozy, an award-winning online backup and recovery system. She was also hired by MTV and Dick Clark Productions to host online preshows for awards broadcasts. In April 2009, she had approximately 50,000 MySpace friends and the system limit of 5,000 Facebook friends. An April 2009, USA Today article credited her as having 386,000 Twitter followers. By June 2009, she had 590,000 Twitter followers, 94,000 subscribers to the iJustine YouTube channel, and 25,000 Facebook fans. The USA Today story described how she has scaled down her lifecasting because of its deleterious impact on her life.

Carl's Jr. has hired a team of YouTube stars, including Ezarik to produce made-for-web ads for their new Portobello Mushroom Six-Dollar Burger on the Carl's Jr. YouTube channel, each endorser's YouTube page, and other Google-related media outlets. Following the August 6, 2009, Twitter Denial-of-service attack Ezarik was featured in The Wall Street Journal describing her coping mechanisms, such as repeatedly tapping the F5 function key (the refresh button), for Twitter outages. In December 2009, USA Today reported that Ezarik earns about $75,000 annually from YouTube, and claims she has nearly a million followers on Twitter and 300,000 YouTube subscribers. The same article estimated that she has been viewed on YouTube a total of 64 million times and that her spoof on The Black Eyed Peas' "I Gotta Feeling" drew 4.8 million viewers. The article notes that Ezarik does her work with a $400 Canon Powershot digital camera and a $12 green rug from IKEA to create her green screen.

On March 1, 2010, the 2010 Streamy Awards nominations included her in the Best Vlogger category. Ezarik was listed as 97th in Maxim's "Hot 100" list for the year 2010. In 2010, General Electric hired her to create five videos as part of their Healthymagination campaign. The videos received over 2 million views. She also did some work for Mattel and Intel. In April 2011, she was nominated for the Webby Award for Best Web Personality/Host. The Webby Awards recognizes two classifications of winners each category – The Webby Award, chosen by The International Academy of Digital Arts and Sciences, and The People's Voice Award which is voted on by the public. Ezarik won the People's Voice Award in the category.

In November 2013, Ezarik hosted a social media lounge for the Nickelodeon HALO Awards. She was nominated at the 4th Streamy Awards in 2014 for Best Collaboration with Rooster Teeth, Freddie Wong, Greg Miller, and Adam Kovic. At the 2015 Streamy Awards, Ezarik won in the Lifestyle category.

Ezarik signed with the William Morris Endeavor in July 2017, and she was named one of the top 10 Top Tech/Business Influencers by Forbes for 2017.

On March 10, 2019, Ezarik surpassed 1,000,000,000 views on her iJustine YouTube channel.

On June 13, 2020, along with her sister Jenna, she hosted Same Brain, a podcast centering on technology, world news, and video games.

=== 300-page iPhone bill video ===
Screenshot of the iPhone bill video, showing Ezarik holding up the package

A video recorded by Ezarik about a 300-page iPhone bill that had been mailed to her from AT&T Mobility went viral in August 2007. Her video focused on the unnecessary waste of paper, as the detailed bill itemized all data transfers made during the first billing period of the original iPhone, including every email and text message. The video clip was picked up by tech blogs, and eventually gained mass media attention as a prominent example of the unusually large bills.

==== Background ====
Apple released the iPhone in the United States in June 2007. It came with a software "lock" so it could only be used on the AT&T Mobility network. After purchase, buyers activated their iPhone's AT&T service contract using the Apple iTunes software, during which buyers had the ability to choose their billing preference; however, if no option was specified during activation AT&T defaulted to using detailed billing. Detailed billing itemized every data transfer, including background traffic for e-mail, text messaging, and web browsing. This generated a large number of entries.

After a month's time as early adopters received their first monthly bills, stories of unusually large and expensive iPhone bills circulated. The 300-page bill was exceptional but other heavy users received 50- to 100-page bills. One of the first to attract wider attention was from Ben Kuchera, gaming editor for the technology-related website Ars Technica, who described his 34-sheet, double-sided bill and another 104-page bill sent to a colleague; he wrote, "While many of us have had smart-phones for some time, we've never seen a bill like this."

==== Video ====
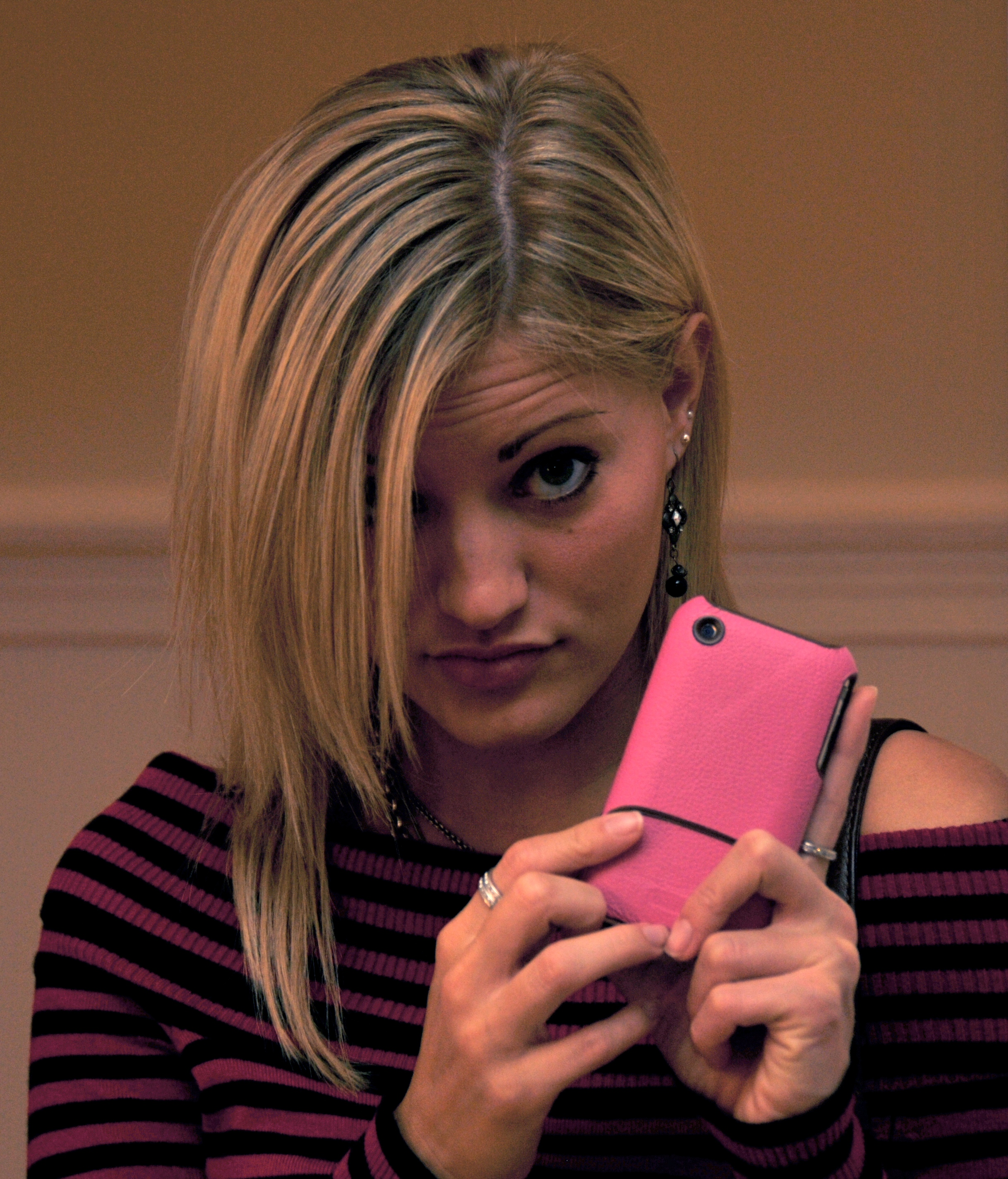
iJustine and her iPhone, in a case, in 2008

Portions of the video were also televised along with one-on-one interviews with Ezarik by several national and local news programs in the United States, including CNN, Fox News Channel, WTAE-TV, and WPXI-TV. ABC News Now also included independent reporting by an ABC News Radio reporter in their video interview.

Ezarik's Internet video commentary focused on the unnecessary waste of paper billing. In the video she highlights the physical size of the bill, not the amount due. "I have an iPhone and I had to switch to AT&T. So, that's wonderful. Well, I got my first AT&T bill, right here in a box," she says at the start of the video. The rest of the video, set to the distinctive music used in American iPhone television commercials, shows her opening the box and flipping through the pages in fast motion. The clip ends with the on-screen caption, "Use e-billing. Save a forest."

Her other comments also followed along the same lines. In a blog posting she wrote, "Apparently, they give you a detailed transaction of every text message sent and received. Completely unnecessary." She told a USA Today reporter, "This is so silly, there's no reason they need to send you this much information." Ezarik is a heavy user who typically sends and receives tens of thousands of text messages a month, which generated an exceptionally long $275 bill – 300 double-sided pages that had to be sent in a box with postage charges of $7.

Ten days later, after the video had been viewed more than 3 million times on the Internet and had received international news coverage, AT&T sent iPhone users a text message outlining changes in its billing practices. The information technology magazine Computerworld included this incident in its list of "Technology's 10 Most Mortifying Moments".

The video earned Ezarik a $5,000 payout from the video hosting service Revver.

== Other ventures ==
=== Acting career ===
On November 4, 2009, she appeared as AJ, a 16-year-old crime victim, in a Season 11 episode of Law & Order: Special Victims Unit titled "Users". She was also a contestant on the 7,000th episode of The Price Is Right on November 5, 2009, airing just one day after her appearance on Law & Order: Special Victims Unit. She won prizes including a first-class trip to Acapulco, Mexico, an Apple Mac Pro computer, a Rolex watch, Viking cooking appliances, and a MIDI recording keyboard. According to her IMDb.com page, in 2009 and 2010 she earned web series guest appearance credits for BlackBoxTV Presents, The Station, and Totally Sketch.

She also has a credit for the November 3, 2010, season 6 episode of Criminal Minds titled "Middle Men". Ezarik had a major recurring role as Orange's love interest, Passion Fruit on the popular YouTube comedy series Annoying Orange. She appeared in the January 5, 2012, season 3 episode of The Vampire Diaries titled "The New Deal". From March 31 to May 5, 2012, she served as a host on the reality TV series Escape Routes. At the time, she had 1.4 million Twitter followers. Ezarik appeared in season 6 of The Guild.

After having been named "the most influential person online" in an article in Fast Company and achieving a number 6 ranking in The Daily Beast's Digital Power Index in 2012, Ezarik signed with United Talent Agency in 2013. In 2014, she was ranked among the 100 most influential people toward 18–34 year olds by Joel Stein of Time. Billboard named her as one of its 2015 Social Media Stars. She has hosted E! News and for NBC. She had a special cameo appearance as Pam in the 2015 comedy film The Wedding Ringer. She appeared in the 2016 Syfy film Sharknado: The 4th Awakens as well as the YouTube Red webseries Escape the Night.

On December 1, 2016, Ezarik announced a boardroom advisor to Arnold Schwarzenegger on the only season of The New Celebrity Apprentice. Ezarik appears as a main character on the YouTube Red murder-mystery series Escape the Night as the Gambler. In episode 3, titled "Buried Alive" she is killed by being buried alive. She also participated in the fourth season of the series, titled Escape the Night: All-Stars, as the Adventurer. She died in the second episode of the season by being choked to death.

=== Published works ===
In May 2014, Simon & Schuster announced that its Atria Publishing Group division had partnered with United Talent Agency and would publish books by a group of social media stars including iJustine. Her book–titled I, Justine (ISBN 1476791511)–was released on June 2, 2015. Fast Company writer David Zax described the book saying, "Ezarik wound up writing a sort of work of investigative journalism about herself by digging into a morass of tweets, photos, and videos to help remind herself who she is."

=== Podcast ===
Same Brain
- Genre: Technology; News; Video Games
- Country of origin: United States
- Language: English

Creative team
- Created by: Justine Ezarik

Cast and voices
- Hosted by: Justine Ezarik; Jenna Ezarik

Production
- Camera: Tyler Davis Carey
- Production: Justine Ezarik; Jenna Ezarik
- Length: 25-60 Min

Technical specifications
- Picture format: 4K UHD
- Video format: YouTube
- Audio format: MP3

Publication
- No. of episodes: 99
- Original release: June 13, 2020 – Present
- Provider: Anchor Podcasts
- License: © iJustine and Jenna

Reception
- Ratings: 4.9/5

Related
- Website: anchor.fm/samebrain

Same Brain is a weekly podcast that is distributed by Anchor Podcasts and is syndicated to Apple Podcasts, Google Podcasts, Spotify, and other listening platforms. Hosted by YouTubers Justine Ezarik and her sister, Jenna, this podcast centers on technology, world news, and video games.

The pilot episode was recorded in the making of Justine's review of the Magic Keyboard for the 4th generation iPad Pro on April 20 during California's stay-at-home order due to the COVID-19 pandemic and was later posted as a test on June 13. The episode garnered positive reaction from fans and production of the podcast came to fruition a week later.

==== Background and development ====
Prior to the development, Justine hosted MacBreak from 2007 to 2011.

When Justine watched the promos for the 4th generation iPad Pro showing all the things that could be done on an iPad, she wondered if she could do a podcast. On March 24, four days after her birthday, Justine recorded a mock podcast under the name "iQuaranJustine" during the recording of the 2020 iPad Pro review. On April 20, while covering the pass-through charging part in her 2020 iPad Pro Magic Keyboard Review, she recorded the pilot episode under the name "Same Brain" with her sister, Jenna.

==== Release ====
The podcast released new episodes on a weekly basis on a Saturday. The first non-special episode was released on January 21, 2021, instead of a typical Saturday.

On September 16, 2022, a new episode was released after a 5-month hiatus.

==== Guests ====
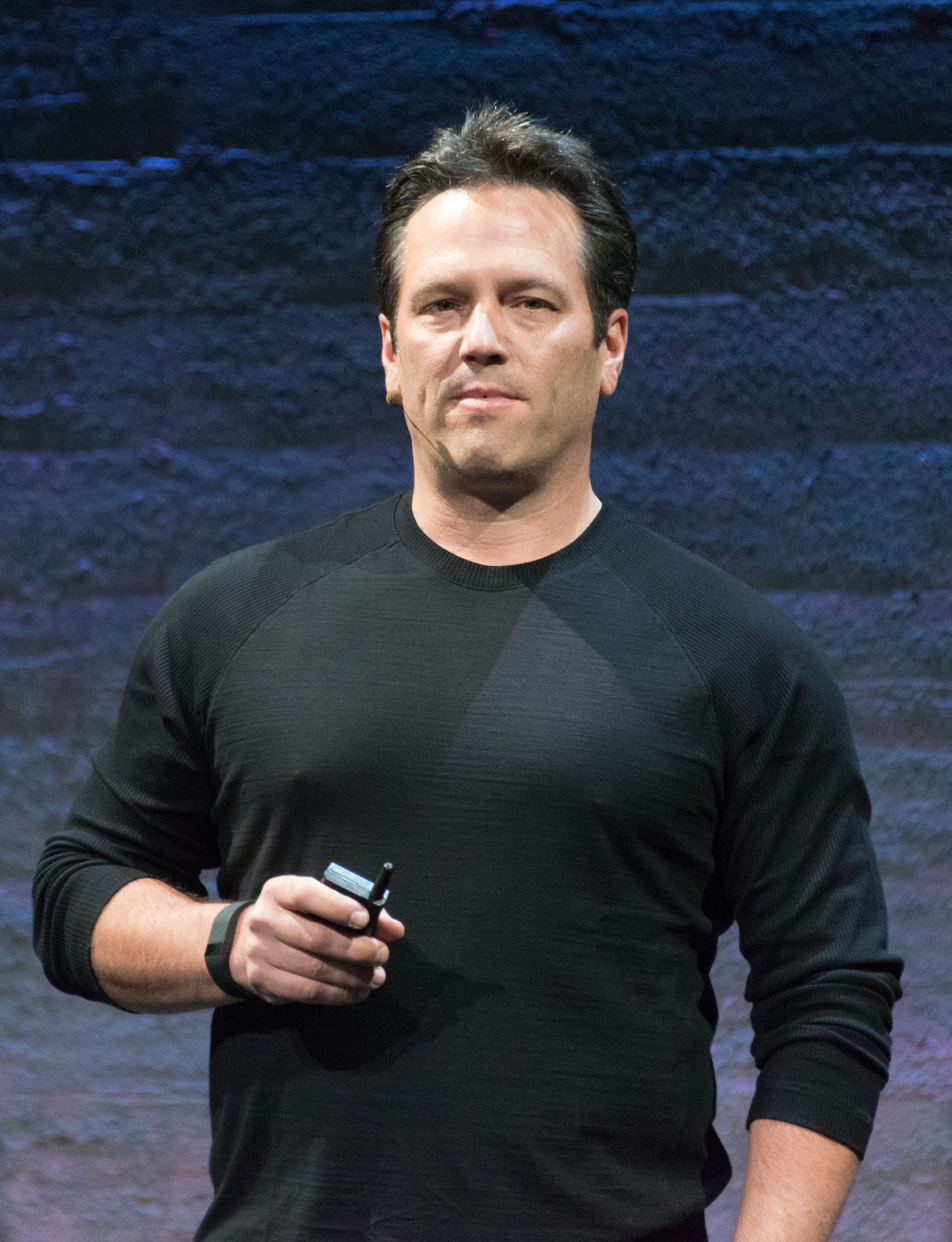
Phil Spencer was the first guest to appear on the Same Brain podcast.

- Phil Spencer – Former head executive of Microsoft's Xbox division. First guest on the show. Appeared on episodes 8, 43, and 59.
- Bob Borchers – Vice president of product marketing at Apple. Appeared on episode 16.
- John Ternus – Vice president of hardware engineering at Apple. Appeared on episodes 16 and 74.
- Tom Green – Actor, comedian, filmmaker, rapper, talk show host, and podcaster. Appeared on episode 19.
- Larry Hryb – Director of Programming for Xbox Live. Appeared on episode 21.
- Shruti Haldea – Pro Mac product line manager at Apple. Appeared on episode 22.
- Alex Yu – Mac product manager at Apple. Appeared on episode 22.
- Justin Roberts – Professional ring announcer. Appeared on episode 27.
- Kenny Florian – Retired mixed martial artist. Previously worked with Justine. Appeared on episode 31.
- Nicki Sun – Host & Filmmaker. Appeared on episode 32.
- James Rath – Legally blind filmmaker, accessibility activist and speaker. Appeared on episode 39.
- Panos Panay – Windows Chief Product Officer. Appeared on episodes 44 and 48.
- Breanne Ezarik – Sister of Justine and Jenna. Appeared on episode 46.
- Tim Cook – CEO of Apple. Appeared on episode 47.
- Harpreet Singh Rai – CEO of Oura Ring. Appeared on episode 51.
- Ben Moon – Filmmaker, author and photographer. Appeared on episode 65.
- Daniel Ek – CEO of Spotify. Appeared on episode 66.
- Sara Dietschy – YouTuber and Content Creator. Appeared on episode 69
- Becki and Chris – Filmmakers. Appeared on episode 70.
- Jacques Slade – Rapper and actor. Appeared on episode 71.
- Lisa Jackson – Vice president of Apple's environment policy social initiative. Appeared on episode 74.
- RJ Scaringe – CEO of Rivian. Appeared on episode 75.

==== Reception ====
Same Brain has a rating of 4.9/5 on Apple Podcasts with over 1.5K ratings.

== Filmography ==
=== Film ===
Year	Title	Role	Notes
2010	The House That Drips Blood on Alex	Melissa	Short film
2015	The Wedding Ringer	Stuart's wife Pam	
2015	Absolute Peril	Jane	
2015	Lazer Team	Vlogger	Cameo
2016	Sharknado: The 4th Awakens	Assistant	Cameo
2017	A Stork's Journey	Social Media Pigeons	

=== Television ===
Year	Title	Role	Notes
2009	Law & Order: Special Victims Unit	A.J. Dunne	Episode: "Users"
2010	Level 26: Dark Prophecy	Kate Hale	Television short
2010	Criminal Minds	Meredith Joy	Episode: "Middle Man"
2010	The Bold and the Beautiful	Reporter No. 3	Episode: "1.5947"
2011	E! News	Herself	Guest host; 2 episodes
2012	The Vampire Diaries	Bartender	Episode: "The New Deal"
2012	Escape Routes	Herself	Co-host; 6 episodes
2012–2014	The High Fructose Adventures of Annoying Orange	Passion Fruit	Main role; 56 episodes
2017	Chopped	Herself	Episode: "Star Power: Web Stars!"
2018	Drone Racing League	Herself	Guest commentator
2026	WUFT at CES 2026: Megabytes and Vegas Nights	Herself	Special guest commentator

=== Web ===
Year	Title	Role	Notes
2009–present	Annoying Orange	Passion Fruit / Mandy	Main cast; 16 episodes
2009	Totally Sketch	Herself	Episode: "Behind the Spoof"
2009	The Station	Herself	Episode: "Zombies Take Over"
2010	The YouTube Assassin	Herself	Episode: "3"
2011	The Last Moments of a Relationship	Girlfriend	Episode: "Blessed Girlfriend"
2012	The Tommy Wi-Show	Herself	Episode: "Fight Night Champion"
2012	Video Game High School	Bella	Episode: "Shot Heard Round the World"
2012	The Guild	Sabina	Episodes: "Into the Breach", "Occupy HQ"
2012–present	YouTubers React	Herself	
2012–2017	YouTube Rewind	Herself	6 episodes
2012–2013	MyMusic	Hipster Idol	Recurring role; 3 episodes
2013	Pancake Manor	Herself	
2013	Lauren	Annie	Recurring role; 2 episodes
2013–present	The Gauntlet	Herself	Recurring role; 6 episodes
2014	District Voices	Herself	
2015	Fight of the Living Dead	Contestant	
2016, 2019	Escape the Night	The Gambler / The Adventurer	Main role; YouTube Red series: 3 episodes (Season One), 2 episodes (Season Four)
2016	Bad Internet	LizzieBeth	Episode: "YouTube Death Battle Showdown"
2017	Good Mythical Morning	Herself	Episode: "Strange Lollipop Taste Test ft. Rosanna Pansino & iJustine"
2017–2018	Linus Tech Tips	Herself	2 episodes
2018	MKBHD	Herself	Episode: "Naming the new iPhone X? Ask MKBHD V30!"
2018	Sorted Food	Herself	Episode: "Reviewing Potentially TERRIBLE Kitchen Gadgets Ft. iJustine"

== Awards and nominations ==
Year	Category	Award	Result	Ref.
2010	Best Vlogger	Streamy Awards	Nominated	
2010	Choice Web Star	Teen Choice Awards	Nominated	
2011	Web Personality/Host	Webby Awards (People's Voice Award)	Won	
2013	Best First-Person Series	Streamy Awards	Nominated	
2014	Choice Web Star	Teen Choice Awards	Nominated	
2014	Choice Web Star: Gaming	Teen Choice Awards	Nominated	
2014	Best Collaboration for The Gauntlet: Season 2 (with Rooster Teeth, Freddie Wong, Greg Miller, and Adam Kovic)	Streamy Awards	Nominated	
2015	Best Lifestyle Series	Streamy Awards	Won	
2016	Best Ensemble Cast for Escape the Night (with Joey Graceffa, Shane Dawson, Sierra Furtado, Lele Pons, GloZell Green, Matt Haag, Oli White, Andrea Brooks, Timothy DeLaGhetto and Eva Gutowski)	Streamy Awards	Won	
2018	Vlogger of the Year	Shorty Awards	Nominated	
2019	Technology	Streamy Awards	Nominated	

== See also ==
- JenniCam
- Brooke Brodack
- Sousveillance
- List of YouTubers

== Bibliography ==
- Ezarik, Justine; Hargrave, C. L. (2015). I, Justine: An Analog Memoir. New York: Keywords Press. ISBN 9781476791517. OCLC 887849720.
