= POTW =

POTW may refer to:

- People of the Web
- Player of the Week (disambiguation)
- Publicly owned treatment works
