= Video journalism =

Form of journalism, shot on video

Video journalism or videojournalism is a form of journalism, where the journalist shoots, edits and often presents their own video material.

== Background ==
A predecessor to video journalism first appeared in the 1960s in the US, when reporters had to write and shoot their own stories. Michael Rosenblum compared the introduction of video cameras to the invention of the portable camera in the 1930s: film spools of plastic made photography independent from heavy plates and tripods, and digital video technology liberates TV from heavy electronic news gathering (ENG) equipment, artificial light and television studios in much the same manner. Video journalism makes it possible for videographers to document any event while it is still occurring.

The concept of the Videojournalist using a small camera was invented by Michael Rosenblum in 1988. The first TV station in the world to use only VJs was TV Bergen, in Bergen, Norway. Rosenblum later built VJ-only TV stations for TV 3 Norway, TV3 Sweden and TV3 Denmark. Around the same time, CITY-TV in Toronto also began to adapt the ideas for their CityPulse newscast and other shows produced at the station, becoming a staple; similar principles were adopted by Citytv head Moses Znaimer at other CHUM television stations and networks.

In the early 1990s, the news channel New York 1 was the first TV station in the US to hire only video journalists and have them trained by Rosenblum. In the mid-1990s, the first German private stations followed the example of NY1, and in 1994, the regional channel Bayerischer Rundfunk became the first public broadcasting station to follow suit and hire a number of video journalists.

In 2001 the BBC started to switch to video journalism in all its regional offices. By June 2005 the BBC has more than 600 of its staff trained as video journalists. Other broadcasting entities who now use video journalism include Voice of America and Video News International. It also seems to be becoming more widespread among newspapers, with the New York Times alone employing twelve video journalists.

The Press Association (UK) is behind a training programme which "converts" regional journalists into video journalists, and more than 100 have been converted as of March 2007.

In Australia, several commercial networks employ Video Journalists. They include WIN News, Golden West Network (GWN) and Network Ten. Increasing popularity in online news has seen Video Journalists employed by Fairfax, News Limited and The West Australian Newspaper Holdings to produce video content for their news websites.

In Canada, the Canadian Broadcasting Corporation made a widespread move into hiring video journalists (or retraining existing reporters or camera people to do multiple jobs) in the late 1990s. In most cases, they were assigned to local newsrooms to do daily news, just as full crews had before. Primarily, it was a cost-saving measure. Within a few years, however, it was clear that this rarely produced good results because of short deadlines and the assumption that VJ's could work the same way and on the same stories. The effort was scaled back.

The exception turned out to be video journalists who work more as independent documentary film-makers, using their electronic field production (EFP) mobility and easier access to do stories that don't have short deadlines. One example of this is award-winning video journalist Sasa Petricic, who works for CBC's flagship daily newscast, The National, and reports solo from around the world. Tara Sutton another Canadian video journalist reported for multiple news outlets from Iraq and other conflicts and won many international awards. She has cited the unobtrusively small equipment of a video journalist as allowing her to move undercover more easily in the extreme danger of Iraq and access places where traditional news crews could not have gone without become targets.

The video journalist Kevin Sites is perhaps the best known having his own website Kevin Sites in the Hot Zone in which he spent a year going from one war to the next. He began as a traditional camera man but switched to video journalism.

The New York Times employs 12 video journalists who come mostly from television and documentary background. The Times' video unit regularly produces documentaries to go along with print pieces that run in the newspaper.

In 2012, former New York Times and Current TV video journalist, Jaron Gilinsky, founded Storyhunter, a network of 25,000 video journalists in 190 countries.

== Pros and cons ==
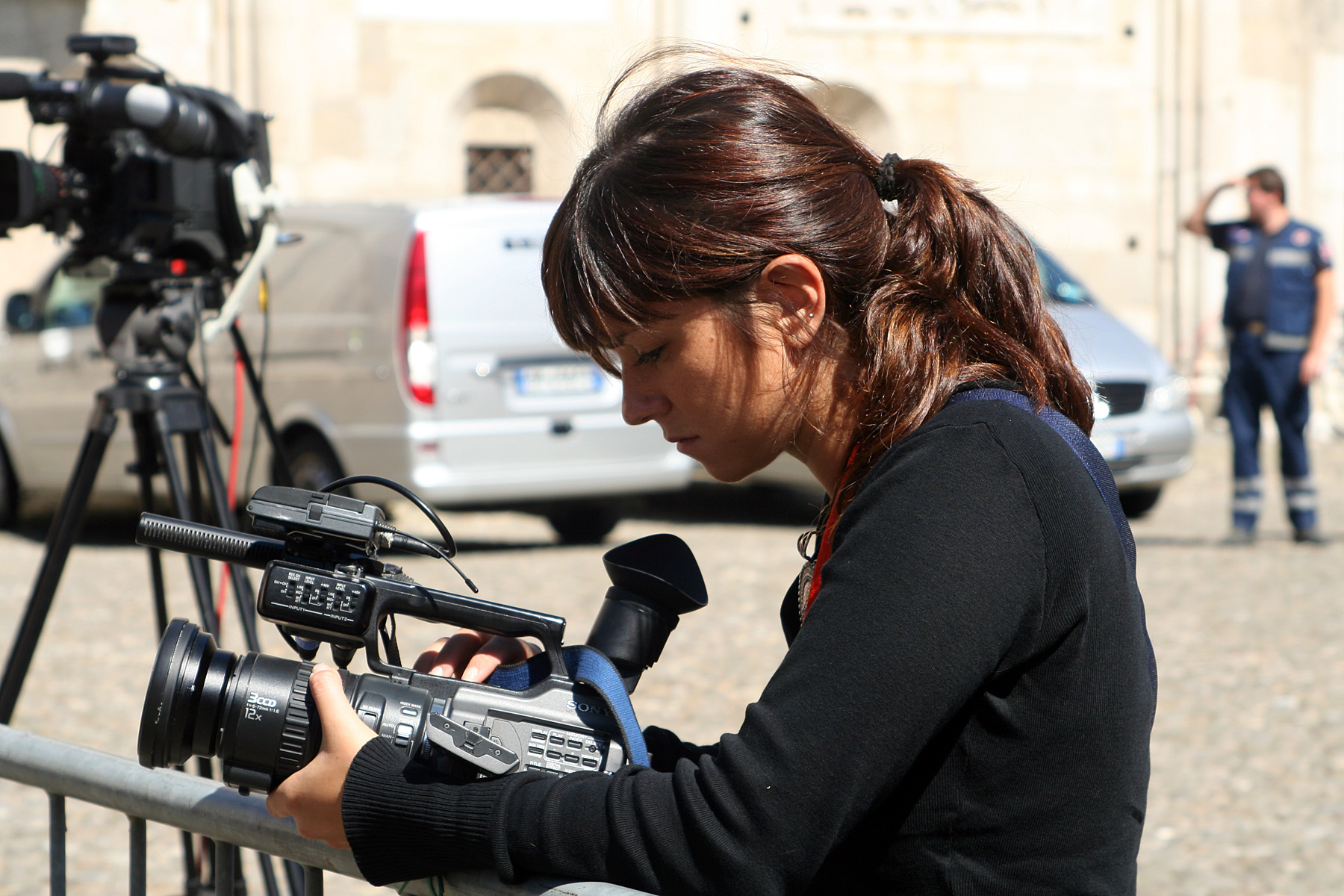
A videojournalist in Italy

Growth in video journalism coincides with changes in video technology and falling costs. As quality cameras and non-linear editing system (NLE) have become smaller and available at a fraction of their previous prices, the single camera operator method has spread.

Some argue that video journalists can get closer to the story, avoiding the impersonality that may come with larger television crewing. In addition, the dramatically lower costs have made possible the birth of many cinéma vérité-style documentary films and television series. Others see this method of production as a dilution of skills and quality driven by television network management cost cutting incentives.

There is a move toward finding independent distribution for freelance video journalists. One of the issues is copyright, which can be difficult to obtain when broadcasters and agencies insist on full ownership of the footage. The other difficulty can be trying to find distribution beyond established contacts. Increasingly, online companies are giving VJs the opportunity to keep ownership of their stories and find global distribution.

== Related words ==
A video journalist is often referred to simply as a "VJ". Other titles for the same or similar job include:

- Solo VJ
- One Man Band or "OMB"
- Multi-Media Journalist or "MMJ"
- Backpack Journalist
- Solo journalist or "SoJo"

== See also ==
- Jesse Freeston
- Jens Erik Gould

== Notes and references ==
- "The Globe and Mail - Home". The Globe and Mail. Toronto.
