= Escape Routes (TV series) =

American reality television series

- Genre: Reality television
- Presented by: Rossi Morreale; Justine Ezarik
- Country of origin: United States
- Original language: English
- No. of seasons: 1
- No. of episodes: 6

Production
- Executive producers: David Leener; Elise Doganieri
- Production company: Profiles Television Productions

Original release
- Network: NBC; mun2
- Release: March 31 – May 5, 2012

Escape Routes is an American reality television series which aired on NBC. The six-part reality competition is a joint venture between NBC and Ford Motor Company, and it features the Ford Escape. It premiered on March 31, 2012. Hosting each episode is Rossi Morreale and YouTube star Justine Ezarik (a.k.a. "iJustine")

== Content ==
Over the course of the show, the six two-person teams travel in Ford Escapes to six major U.S. cities, where they compete in various events to earn points towards winning the competition. The show also involves audience participation from users on the show's website. The show has been described as a combination of branded entertainment and social media marketing, with one reviewer describing it as "one giant commercial for the Ford Motor Company".

== Cast ==
- White Team: Brett Lemick and Ross Everett
- Black Team: Derek Konzelman and Drew Konzelman
- Red Team: Bre Ortola and Tara Rhein
- Grey Team: Iris Hill and Terrence Davis
- Blue Team: Sharon Montero and Wilson Montero
- Yellow Team: Chekesha Johnson and Tiffany Jackson

== Ratings ==
The series premiere drew 1.12 million viewers and 0.2 Adults 18-49 rating on March 31, 2012. The series rose to 1.17 million viewers and a 0.3 Adults 18-49 rating in its second week. The third episode attained the most viewers with 1.20 million tuning in and 0.2 Adults 18-49 rating on April 14, 2012.
