= People of the Web =

Weekly Yahoo! news feature series about famous internet celebrities

Title slide from the People of the Web series

People of the Web was a weekly Yahoo! News feature series that profiled the faces behind the Internet. It reported on World Wide Web content creators, particularly the ones "who are really changing the political, social and religious fabric," according to the show's host, award winning journalist Kevin Sites.

The format included both video and text stories. Sites cites the focus on the business aspect of web content, and the relative lack of coverage of web personalities as the motivation for the series.

Sites' previous project was a year-long series of stories for Yahoo! from various war zones around the world called "Kevin Sites in the Hot Zone", and he brought the same traveling video journalist style to this project. He used the same support crew from that series. Neeraj Khemlani, VP, Programming & Development for Yahoo! News & Info said they simply moved from putting a human face on war, to putting a human face on the Internet.

Gal Beckerman wrote in the Columbia Journalism Review that, "the idea of the series is so brilliant and filled with seemingly endless possibility that it’s amazing no one thought of it before."

The series premiered May 29, 2007. It posted several feature stories including profiles on:

- lifecasters Justin Kan and iJustine from Justin.tv
- former child star turned evangelical Christian Kirk Cameron
- gay-activist blogger Mike Rogers who specializes in outing closeted gay politicians
- a grandfather/grandson duo hosting an online worldwide group hug
- a convicted felon that leads a police watch dog group
- San Francisco based video blogger Josh Wolf that addressed the question, "Can bloggers be journalists?"

The web series has now ended.
