= Semper Fi & America's Fund =

US non-profit organization

Semper Fi & America's Fund (CFC #11459)
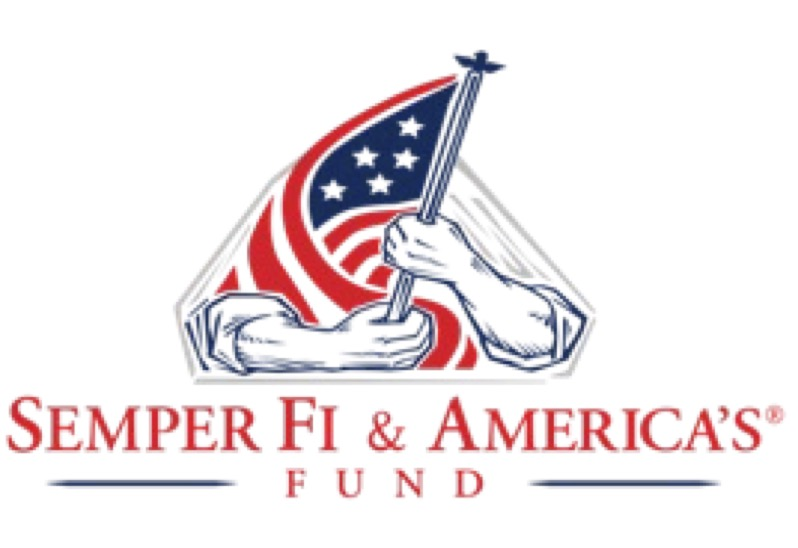
- Founded: May 17, 2004
- Founder: Karen Guenther
- Type: 501(c)(3) corporation
- Purpose: To provide immediate financial assistance and lifetime support to wounded, critically ill and injured service members, veterans, and military families from all branches of the U.S. Armed Forces.
- Headquarters: Camp Pendleton, California
- Expenses: Semper Fi & America's Fund has maintained an overhead of 7% since its inception. The organization earns the highest ratings possible from charity watchdogs Charity Navigator and Charity Watch.
- Staff: 140+ (2023)
- Volunteers: 100+ (2023)
- Website: thefund.org

Semper Fi & America's Fund is a non-profit 501(c)(3) organization that provides a variety of programs to assist wounded veterans in all branches of the United States Armed Forces. The organization describes its mission as "providing urgently needed resources and financial support for combat wounded, critically ill and catastrophically injured members" of the U.S. Armed Forces and their families. As of November 2023, Semper Fi & America's Fund (The Fund) has provided more than $312 million in assistance to over 31,000 service members and their families.

== History ==
=== Formation ===
Semper Fi & America's Fund began in early 2003 as a gathering of military spouses around a kitchen table discussing ways to help Marines who had been injured during the invasion of Iraq. Early efforts included the distribution of snacks and toiletries at hospitals and a specialized van for a catastrophically injured Marine.

=== Incorporation ===
The nonprofit was officially incorporated as the Injured Marine Semper Fi Fund on May 17, 2004. General Alfred M. Gray, Jr., who served as the 29th Commandant of the Marine Corps from 1987 to 1991, was named the chairman of the board of The Fund and served in this position until November 2014.

=== First donation ===
The first official donation to The Fund was made by the Lighthouse Christian Church in Oceanside, California. Throughout 2004, The Fund received more than $2 million in donations.

=== Milestones ===
- On April 25, 2005, Cookie Magazine announced that Semper Fi & America's Fund founder, president and CEO Karen Guenther and co-founders Wendy Lethin and Sondria Saylor, were recipients of the first-ever Smart Cookie Awards, which recognize and support mothers in the business, philanthropy, and celebrity worlds who are making outstanding contributions to women's and children's causes around the globe. Other recipients included Mariska Hargitay, Marcia Gay Harden and Cynthia Nixon.
- In June 2007, The Fund announced that it had raised and given away more than $50 million in assistance to service members and their families.
- On November 19, 2007, The Fund received the Spirit of Hope Award at a Pentagon ceremony in which all branches of the service were recognized. The award, which was established by the Hope Family Foundation in 1997 in honor of Bob Hope, is for patriotism and service reflecting the essence of Bob Hope's dedication to those in the Armed Forces.
- On June 9, 2012, The Fund announced the creation of America's Fund, a self-funded program of The Fund created to direct urgently needed resources and financial support to injured and critically ill members of all branches of the U.S. Armed Forces and their families.
- In February 2013, Karen Guenther was named Marine Corps Spouse of the Year. She had previously been nominated for 2011 Military Spouse of the Year. In an interview on CBS This Morning on July 4, 2013, Guenther noted that since beginning The Fund in 2004 with $500, the organization had raised $101 million.
- On September 20, 2014, Karen Guenther was named an Honorary Marine by General James F. Amos, 35th Commandant of the Marine Corps.
- On November 17, 2014, Karen Guenther received the Zachary and Elizabeth Fisher Distinguished Civilian Humanitarian Award in a ceremony at the Pentagon.
- On January 28, 2015, The Fund announced they had crossed the $100 million mark in providing assistance to wounded, critically ill and injured service members and their families.
- On June 1, 2017, The Fund announced they had crossed the $150 million mark in providing assistance to wounded, critically ill and injured service members and their families.
- In 2017, The Fund was presented the U.S. Special Operations Command Patriot Award for exceptional and enduring contributions to the welfare of Special Operations Command wounded warriors and their families from July 2003 to September 2017.
- In 2018, The Fund established the LCpl Parsons Welcome Home Fund designed to care for veterans from all U.S. military service branches who are catastrophically injured from combat operations in Vietnam.
- On January 21, 2020, The Fund announced that former chairman of the Joint Chiefs of Staff General Joseph F. Dunford, Jr. was named chairman of the board.

=== Fiscal year overviews ===
- In fiscal year 2019, The Fund provided 29,200 grants totaling $24,114,000 to 6,600 service members and their families.
- In fiscal year 2020, The Fund provided 31,200 grants totaling $23,621,000 to 19,100 service members and their families.
- In fiscal year 2021, The Fund provided 35,900 grants totaling $26,100,000 to 9,175 service members and their families.
- In fiscal year 2022, The Fund provided 45,400 grants totaling $31,600,000 to 11,000 service members and their families.
- In fiscal year 2023, The Fund provided 38,400 grants totaling $29,500,000 to 11,700 service members and their families.

=== Operating overhead ===
The Fund has maintained an operating overhead of 7% on average since its inception.

== Programs and Assistance ==
The Semper Fi Fund provides a wide variety of assistance to wounded, critically ill and injured service members. These programs are categorized into three main programs:

=== Service Member and Family Support Program ===
Described on the Semper Fi & America's Fund website as providing "direct financial assistance and vital programming for combat wounded, critically ill and catastrophically injured service members and their families during hospitalization and recovery," the Service Member and Family Support Program includes:

- Bedside Financial Support that provides "needs-based financial assistance for expenses that are most pressing during a long hospitalization or rehabilitation. Typically families use this grant to help with additional travel and lodging expenses, childcare, and out of pocket expenses."
- Caregiver Support & Retreats that provide "coping tools and techniques for these amazing people who play such a critical role in the recovery process. The variety of activities are designed to reduce the challenges and stress experienced by caregivers all day, every day."
- Housing Assistance designed to help service members by providing funding toward the cost of modifying existing homes with modifications to accommodate handicapped service members in wheelchairs. The Housing Assistance Program also grants assistance to those who have fallen behind on their housing payment due to injury, recovery and rehabilitation costs. An example of The Fund's work in this area was featured in February 2016 on The Today Show)
- Transportation Assistance that provides adaptive modes of transportation to include modified wheelchairs, vehicles and snow removal equipment.
- Skip's Kids Program that provides care and support for children in military families who are dealing with their own critical injury or illness, or who are feeling the impact of having a wounded, ill, or injured parent.
- Specialized & Adaptive Equipment grants that "cover many different types of equipment that can improve the quality of life for service members with disabilities. These include optic enhancement devices for the visually impaired, software programs for those who cannot type, specialized wheelchairs as needed and therapeutic mattresses for those with multiple injuries and burns."
- Visiting Nurse Program that provides emotional support, assistance in the development of coping skills, identifies health and wellness needs, gaps in care, and barriers to using a self-care management model.
- LCpl Parsons Welcome Home Fund designed to care for veterans from all U.S. military service branches who are catastrophically injured from combat operations in Vietnam.

=== Transition Program ===
Semper Fi & America's Fund describes their Transition Program on their website as a program that "makes it easier for wounded service members to thrive beyond injury to recovery. Education support and career assistance provides them with the tools and skills to successfully reconnect with their communities and build new, productive lives." The Transition Program includes:

- Education & Career Assistance designed to help service members with books, training fees, travel to job interviews, interview attire, computers, software and other equipment needed to pursue education opportunities and/or a new career. Through several partnership programs, this program also offers career-enhancing seminars and week-long workshops at no cost to the service member that help develop the networking, resume-writing and interview skills necessary to transition into the community workplace.
- Veteran & Unit Reunions that provide a multi-day outdoor experience to servicemembers of a unit who deployed together.
- Veteran 2 Veteran Support (V2V), an integrated transition program that trains and empowers veterans (known as Veteran Leads) to help other veterans make a smoother transition back to civilian life.
- Semper Fi Odyssey Retreat, a six-day, holistic transition assistance program for injured and critically ill service members in which participants learn how to transition into civilian life by learning about life-planning skills, establishing goals, employment resources, and by learning to balance four important MEPS elements: Mental, Emotional, Physical and Spiritual.
- The Apprenticeship Program that establishes mentoring relationships with leading industry experts, providing a powerful and productive way for Service members to reintegrate into the community. The program assists service members with a 70% or greater disability rating find meaningful trades, careers and small business opportunities through short-term vocational education and apprenticeships.

=== Integrative Wellness Program ===
Described on their website as "inclusive wellness programs [that] provide targeted services and resources to meet the specific needs of those we assist," The Fund's Integrative Wellness Program includes:

- PTSD and TBI Support designed to address the consequences of exposure to blasts and explosions while in theater.
- NeuroFitness focusing on Neurofeedback training that helps restore cognitive function, improve memory, manage pain and assist with other stress-related issues.
- Specialized Equipment that has been prescribed or recommended by primary care physicians to help service members with injuries or illnesses, including Alpha-Stim, AVE, Emwaves, Irlen glasses, Celluma and others.
- Post-Traumatic Growth Video Resources, a comprehensive educational video series focusing on specific issues to assist today's post 9/11 service member.
- Counseling grants for costs associated with therapy and counseling not covered by military benefits.
- Peter Murphy Sports Program - Team Semper Fi that is composed of service members from all branches of the military who use recreational sports and competitive athletics as a tool in their recovery process.
- Tim & Sandy Day Canine Companions Program that unites injured service members with service dogs while ensuring the dogs are properly trained. The program also assists financially with the continuous care for the dog while the injured service member physically rehabilitates and transitions back to civilian life.

=== Specific assistance ===
Specific assistance made in fiscal year 2023 and reported by The Fund in its 2023 annual report includes:

- $29.5 Million of support delivered to 11,700 service members and their families
- $21 Million in support delivered to 10,900 service members through the Service Member & Family Support Program
- $5.3 Million in support delivered to 2750 service members through the Integrative Wellness Program
- $3.2 Million in support delivered to 1800 service members through the Transition Program
- 2,000 grants made to first-time grant recipients
- Basic Needs Assistance delivered to 4500 service members and families.

== Boston Marathon Bombing Survivors ==
In the aftermath of the April 15, 2013 Boston Marathon bombings, The Fund paid for a group of veterans to travel to Boston to assist the survivors of the bombings with information and moral support. According to Marine veteran B.J. Ganem, who lost his leg to an improvised explosive device in Iraq, the aftermath of the bombing, "looked exactly like something we saw in Iraq and Afghanistan."

== Notable Fundraising ==
=== Bob & Renee Parsons Foundation ===
- On January 11, 2024, The Fund announced that its year-end Double Down for Veterans fundraising campaign raised more than $26.8 million – including a $10 million match from The Bob & Renee Parsons Foundation, marking the twelfth consecutive year that the foundation matched donations to The Fund and raising the foundation's cumulative total of donations to The Fund since 2012 to over $100 million.
- On January 12, 2022, The Fund announced that it raised a total of $24.4 million during its annual "Double Down for Veterans" fundraising campaign. With the funds raised and the substantial $10 million matching contribution by The Bob & Renee Parsons Foundation, the campaign netted a total of $24,402,000 in funding to support injured members of all branches of the U.S. Armed Forces and their families.
- On January 11, 2021, The Fund announced that its year-end Double Down for Veterans fundraising campaign raised more than $20 million – including a $10 million match from The Bob & Renee Parsons Foundation. Since the campaign began in 2012, Double Down for Veterans has raised more than $142 million through contributions from both donors and a dollar-for-dollar match from The Bob & Renee Parsons Foundation.
- On January 30, 2019, The Fund announced that its year-end Double Down for Veterans fundraising campaign raised more than $20 million – including a $10 million match from The Bob & Renee Parsons Foundation, marking the seventh consecutive year that the foundation matched donations to The Fund and raising the foundation's cumulative total of donations to The Fund since 2012 to $51.2 million.
- On March 6, 2017, The Fund announced that it raised a total of $20 million during its annual fundraising campaign: The $10 million raised by the fund qualified it for a matching $10 million challenge grant from the Bob & Renee Parsons Foundation — marking the fifth consecutive year that GoDaddy founder Bob Parsons (a U.S. Marine Corps veteran and recipient of the Purple Heart, Combat Action Ribbon, and Vietnamese Cross of Gallantry) has provided matching funds to help military veterans and their families.
- On November 10, 2015, The Bob & Renee Parsons Foundation, with support from GoDaddy, announced the 10 Makes 20 Challenge, one of the largest matching campaigns in the history of veteran nonprofits. Through December 31, 2015, donations made to The Fund will be matched by The Bob & Renee Parsons Foundation, dollar-for-dollar, up to a total of $10 million—meaning a potential $20 million can be raised for The Fund
- On January 9, 2015, The Fund announced that a year-ending fundraising challenge in conjunction with GoDaddy and the Bob & Renee Parsons Foundation had raised $12 million.
- On October 10, 2013, The Fund announced that it had received a $1 million donation from the Bob & Renee Parsons Foundation.
- On December 8, 2012, GoDaddy announced that GoDaddy and The Bob and Renee Parsons Foundation presented The Fund with checks totaling $2 million.

=== Additional major donations ===
- On May 17, 2017, Mission BBQ co-founders, Bill Kraus and Steve Newton presented a donation of $61,618 to Sergeant Major Carlton Kent, Semper Fi & America's Fund Board member and 16th Sergeant Major of the Marine Corps.
- In January 2017, former WNBA player Lisa Leslie raised $75,000 for the Fund competing on The New Celebrity Apprentice.
- On October 17, 2011, the Home Depot Foundation announced a $500,000 grant to The Fund.
- On March 7, 2011, The Fund announced it had received a $2 million donation from television personality Bob Barker.

== Charity Watchdog Ratings ==
=== Charity Navigator ===
Provided The Fund with thirteen consecutive four-star ratings (only 2% of rated charities achieve this level of recognition), reflecting scores of 100 out of 100 for accountability and transparency and 97.50 out of 100 for financial performance. These rankings placed The Fund at the very top of Charity Navigator's list of charities performing similar types of work.

=== CharityWatch ===
Gives The Fund an A+ rating, one of only three of the 64 veteran and military charities reviewed to receive this highest ranking. CharityWatch lists The Fund as a Top-Rated Charity in their Veterans & Military category. According to Charity Watch, "groups included on the Top-Rated list generally spend 75% or more of their budgets on programs, spend $25 or less to raise $100 in public support, do not hold excessive assets in reserve, and receive "open-book" status for disclosure of basic financial information and documents to CharityWatch."

Daniel Borochoff, founder and president of CharityWatch, has said this about The Fund: "They give 93, 94 percent of their spending toward bona fide real programs that help veterans, and their cost to raise money is very small. It's only like 3 or 4 percent."

=== GuideStar ===
Provides The Fund with Platinum-level recognition, including the 2023 Platinum Seal of Transparency. According to the GuideStar website, "GuideStar Platinum encourages nonprofit organizations to share their progress and results in important new ways—moving way beyond simplistic financial ratios—to reflect the changes organizations are making in the world." As of March 2024, 48 personal reviews on GuideStar provided The Fund with an average rating of five stars.
