= The New Celebrity Apprentice =

- Season 15
- No. of tasks: 12
- No. of contestants: 16
- Winner: Matt Iseman
- Runner-up: Boy George
- No. of episodes: 13

Release
- Original network: NBC
- Original release: January 2 – February 13, 2017

The New Celebrity Apprentice (also known simply as The Apprentice) is the eighth and final installment of the reality game show The Celebrity Apprentice, thus making it the fifteenth and final installment of The Apprentice as a whole. It aired from January 2 to February 13, 2017. The winner of this season was Matt Iseman.

The season marked the only appearance of Arnold Schwarzenegger, actor and former Governor of California, as host. NBC had cut ties with the show's previous and original host Donald Trump, following the start of his presidential campaign in 2015. Trump remained as an executive producer through the show's production company, MGM Television.

NBC announced the 16 contestants, as well as advisors Warren Buffett, Tyra Banks, Steve Ballmer, Jessica Alba, and Patrick M. Knapp Schwarzenegger, on January 28, 2016. On December 1, 2016, six more advisors were announced. Those advisers were former The Apprentice winner Leeza Gibbons, celebrity chef Rocco DiSpirito, Extra co-host Tracey Edmonds, The Biggest Loser host Bob Harper, YouTuber iJustine, and Moola CEO Gemma Godfrey. The season was filmed in Los Angeles.

Along with the change of host and location, the catch phrase that accompanied a candidate's elimination from the show was changed from "You're fired" to "You're terminated", a reference to one of Schwarzenegger's most famous film roles. Also, instead of sending contestants away in a taxi cab or limousine, Schwarzenegger would send them away with a helicopter, telling them to "get to the chopper", a reference to the film Predator.

On March 3, 2017, Schwarzenegger announced he would leave the show after one season, since he did not like the "baggage" attached to the show caused by Trump. On August 3, 2017, NBC announced that the show had been cancelled outright.

== Candidates ==
The cast was announced on January 28, 2016.

Celebrity	Background	Original team	Age	Hometown	Charity	Result	Raised
Matt Iseman	American Ninja Warrior host	Arete	45	Denver, Colorado	Arthritis Foundation	The Celebrity Apprentice (02–13–17)	$923,329
Boy George	Culture Club singer	Arete	55	London, England	Safe Kids Worldwide	Terminated in the season finale (02–13–17)	$545,925
Brooke Burke-Charvet	Television host & model	Prima	45	Tucson, Arizona	Operation Smile	Terminated in task 12 (02–06–17)	$100,000
Laila Ali	Professional boxer	Prima	39	Miami, Florida	Women's Sports Foundation	Terminated in task 11 (02–06–17)	$50,000
Lisa Leslie	WNBA player	Prima	44	Inglewood, California	Semper Fi Fund	Terminated in task 10 (01–30–17)	$75,000
Carson Kressley	Fashion designer & television host	Arete	47	Orefield, Pennsylvania	True Colors Fund	Terminated in task 10 (01–30–17)	$25,000
Ricky Williams	NFL running back	Arete	39	San Diego, California	Dr. John E. Upledger Foundation	Terminated in task 9 (01–30–17)	
Porsha Williams	The Real Housewives of Atlanta star & Dish Nation co-host	Prima	35	Decatur, Georgia	HOSEA	Terminated in task 8 (01–23–17)	
Chael Sonnen	UFC fighter	Arete	39	West Linn, Oregon	Hire Heroes USA	Disqualified in task 8 (01–23–17)	
Vince Neil	Mötley Crüe singer	Arete	55	Glendora, California	Lou Ruvo Center for Brain Health by Keep Memory Alive	Terminated in task 7 (01–23–17)	$769,280
Jon Lovitz	Comedian	Arete	59	Tarzana, California	St. Jude Children's Research Hospital	Terminated in task 6 (01–16–17)	$50,000
Kyle Richards	The Real Housewives of Beverly Hills star & actress	Prima	48	Beverly Hills, California	Children's Hospital Los Angeles	Terminated in task 5 (01–16–17)	$25,000
Nicole "Snooki" Polizzi	Jersey Shore star	Prima	29	Marlboro, New York	North Shore Animal League America	Terminated in task 4 (01–09–17)	
Eric Dickerson	Former NFL running back	Arete	56	Sealy, Texas	Young Warriors	Terminated in task 3 (01–09–17)	
Carnie Wilson	Wilson Phillips singer	Prima	48	Bel Air, California	The Weight Loss Surgery Foundation of America	Terminated in task 2 (01–02–17)	
Carrie Keagan	Talk show host & actress	Prima	36	Amherst, New York	The Humane Society of the United States	Terminated in task 1 (01–02–17)	

== Weekly results ==
Candidate	Original team	Task 6 team	Task 9 team	Task 11 team	Final Task team	Application result	Record as project manager
Matt Iseman	Arete	Arete	Arete	Arete	Arete	The Celebrity Apprentice	2–0 (win in tasks 4 & 8)
Boy George	Arete	Arete	Prima	Prima	Prima	Terminated in the season finale	2–0 (win in tasks 1 & 11)
Brooke Burke-Charvet	Prima	Arete	Arete	Prima		Terminated in task 12	2–0 (win in tasks 7 & 10)
Laila Ali	Prima	Arete	Arete	Arete	Prima	Terminated in task 11	1–1 (win in task 3, loss in task 11)
Carson Kressley	Arete	Prima	Prima		Prima	Terminated in task 10	1–2 (win in task 5, loss in tasks 8 & 10)
Lisa Leslie	Prima	Prima	Prima			Terminated in task 10	1–1 (win in task 9, loss in task 7)
Ricky Williams	Arete	Arete	Arete			Terminated in task 9	0–2 (loss in tasks 6 & 9)
Porsha Williams	Prima	Prima			Prima	Terminated in task 8	0–1 (loss in task 1)
Chael Sonnen	Arete	Prima				Disqualified in task 8	0–1 (loss in task 3)
Vince Neil	Arete	Prima				Terminated in task 7	1–0 (win in task 6)
Jon Lovitz	Arete	Arete				Terminated in task 6	1–0 (win in task 2)
Kyle Richards	Prima				Arete	Terminated in task 5	0–1 (loss in task 5)
Nicole "Snooki" Polizzi	Prima					Terminated in task 4	0–1 (loss in task 4)
Eric Dickerson	Arete					Terminated in task 3	
Carnie Wilson	Prima				Arete	Terminated in task 2	0–1 (loss in task 2)
Carrie Keagan	Prima				Arete	Terminated in task 1	

Termination chart
No.	Candidate	1	2	3	4	5	6	7	8	9	10	11	12	13
1	Matt	IN	IN	IN	WIN	IN	IN	IN	WIN	IN	IN	IN	IN	CA
2	Boy George	WIN	IN	IN	IN	IN	IN	IN	IN	IN	IN	WIN	IN	FIRED
3	Brooke	IN	IN	IN	IN	BR	IN	WIN	IN	BR	WIN	IN	FIRED	
4	Laila	IN	IN	WIN	IN	IN	BR	IN	IN	BR	IN	FIRED		
5	Carson	IN	IN	IN	IN	WIN	IN	IN	LOSE	IN	FIRED			
6	Lisa	IN	BR	IN	BR	IN	IN	LOSE	IN	WIN	FIRED			
7	Ricky	IN	IN	BR	IN	IN	LOSE	IN	IN	FIRED				
8	Porsha	LOSE	IN	IN	BR	BR	IN	IN	FIRED					
9	Chael	IN	IN	LOSE	IN	IN	IN	BR	DQ					
10	Vince	IN	IN	IN	IN	IN	WIN	FIRED						
11	Jon	IN	WIN	IN	IN	IN	FIRED							
12	Kyle	IN	IN	IN	IN	FIRED								
13	Nicole	BR	BR	IN	FIRED									
14	Eric	IN	IN	FIRED										
15	Carnie	IN	FIRED											
16	Carrie	FIRED												

The candidate was on the winning team.
The candidate was on the losing team.
The candidate won the competition and was named the Celebrity Apprentice
The candidate won as project manager on his/her team.
The candidate lost as project manager on his/her team.
The candidate was on the losing team and brought to the final boardroom.
The candidate was terminated.
The candidate lost as project manager and was terminated.
The candidate was disqualified from the competition for breaking the rules.
The candidate was excused from the task but not terminated.

== Episodes ==
No. overall	No. in season	Title	Original release date	Prod. code	US viewers (millions)
84	1	"In Here You Call Me Governor"	January 2, 2017	1501	4.95
Task 1: Task Scope: Tyra Banks Cosmetics—Teams were to prepare a five-minute meet-and-greet experience to showcase and demonstrate a new line of makeup.; Prima Project Manager: Porsha Williams; Arete Project Manager: Boy George; Judges: Arnold Schwarzenegger, Tyra Banks, Patrick Schwarzenegger; Winning team: Arete; Reasons for win: The team all learned how to help apply the makeup, and used their celebrity status effectively for the experience.; Losing team: Prima; Reasons for loss: Celebrity "image" not used to full potential; Sent to boardroom: Porsha Williams, Carrie Keagan, Nicole "Snooki" Polizzi; Terminated: Carrie Keagan—for Schwarzenegger believing she was the weakest link of the three. The governor praised Porsha Williams for her leadership. Even though Carrie was her assistant, she still didn't contribute as much as the other women on Team Prima.; Task 2: Task Scope: Trident—Teams were to prepare a short advertisement, including a jingle and video, for Trident's new gum brand.; Prima Project Manager: Carnie Wilson; Arete Project Manager: Jon Lovitz; Judges: Arnold Schwarzenegger, Tyra Banks, Patrick Schwarzenegger; Winning team: Arete; Reasons for win: While the video lacked some professional quality, the Trident executives felt it strongly carried the message about showing off one's smile.; Losing team: Prima; Reasons for loss: The marketing video did not send the message that the Trident executives requested.; Sent to boardroom: Carnie Wilson, Lisa Leslie, Nicole "Snooki" Polizzi; Terminated: Carnie Wilson—Schwarzenegger had no reason to terminate Lisa Leslie or Nicole Polizzi, for being the project manager, and for not bringing back Kyle Richards, who came up with the boxing idea that led to the team's failure to win; NOTE: Eric Dickerson did not participate in this task due to a previous engagement.
85	2	"Fire Up That Chopper"	January 9, 2017	1502	3.91
Task 3: Task Scope: Welch's—Teams had to come up with a talk show-like experience to Welch's executives and a studio audience on the health benefits of grape juice.; Prima Project Manager: Laila Ali; Arete Project Manager: Chael Sonnen; Judges: Arnold Schwarzenegger, Rocco DiSpirito, Patrick Schwarzenegger; Winning team: Prima; Reasons for win: The women put together a more cohesive talk-show experience that gave the health-related message well.; Losing team: Arete; Reasons for loss: While as entertaining and interactive as the women's show, the men's talk-show lacked cohesion and lost the message the executives wanted told.; Sent to boardroom: Chael Sonnen, Ricky Williams, Eric Dickerson; Terminated: Eric Dickerson—Schwarzenegger felt that Dickerson contributed very little and exhibited a nonchalant attitude. He was going to terminate Chael Sonnen, but Sonnen fought to stay in the game. Also, after missing the second task, the Governor felt that Dickerson should have made a better effort, but Dickerson's heart wasn't in it and he had expressed that he wouldn't care if the Governor terminated him.; Task 4: Task Scope: King's Hawaiian—Teams had to come up with two viral videos to showcase the new King's Hawaiian line of barbecue sauces.; Prima Project Manager: Nicole "Snooki" Polizzi; Arete Project Manager: Matt Iseman; Judges: Arnold Schwarzenegger, Justine Ezarik, Patrick Schwarzenegger; Winning team: Arete; Reasons for win: Both videos from the men readily displayed the product and were considered funny, though lacked some production values.; Losing team: Prima; Reasons for loss: While one video was considered great by the executives, the second video lacked production values, had no story line that could be followed, and lacked connection to the product.; Sent to boardroom: Nicole "Snooki" Polizzi, Porsha Williams, Lisa Leslie; Terminated: Nicole "Snooki" Polizzi—Schwarzenegger felt that Snooki was not a strong contestant and was willing to take responsibility. The women argued over whose fault it was, and Snooki broke down in tears. Arnold determined that the competition was too much for her, and she agreed and was sent to the chopper.
86	3	"Candy For a Billionaire"	January 16, 2017	1503	4.33
Task 5: Task Scope: Kawasaki—Teams were to run a photo shoot and prepare a four-page brochure for Kawasaki's new motorcycle line.; Prima Project Manager: Kyle Richards; Arete Project Manager: Carson Kressley; Judges: Arnold Schwarzenegger, Gemma Godfrey, Patrick Schwarzenegger; Winning team: Arete; Reasons for win: The men had a more out-of-the-box campaign idea, although some of their shots, including a tasteful nude of Carson Kressley on the motorcycle, might not resonate with their customer base.; Losing team: Prima; Reasons for loss: The women had more artistic photos than the men, but the campaign was considered safe, and the executives were concerned about a photo that had Brooke and her husband David Charvet which had put David in front, counter to their goal to sell the motorcycle to women.; Sent to boardroom: Kyle Richards, Brooke Burke-Charvet, Porsha Williams; Terminated: Kyle Richards—not only for the creativity, Richards has made too many mistakes throughout this whole season. While Burke tried to defend the issue with her husband, she refused to take “responsibility” for the whole team’s loss. Richards kept her in jeopardy, though, along with Williams, as that was the other photo which was negatively singled out. Schwarzenegger noted this wasn’t the first time Richards’ creativity had led to a loss, and since she was now project manager, she was “terminated.”; NOTE: Kawasaki thought both teams did very well, so they decided to give Kyle Richards $25,000 for her charity despite her team's loss.; Task 6: Task Scope: See's Candies—Teams were to prepare a celebrity-branded candy, and then sell these candies for the most money, using their connections to help raise the money. In addition, the team that made the best-tasting candy as judged by Warren Buffett would get a $25,000 bonus towards their money total. Buffett would meet with all members of each team in Omaha to sample the candies. The winning project manager would get all the money raised by the task.; Prima Project Manager: Vince Neil; Arete Project Manager: Ricky Williams; Judges: Arnold Schwarzenegger, Gemma Godfrey, Patrick Schwarzenegger; Winning team: Prima; Reasons for win: Team Prima had raised $378,535. They did research on Warren Buffett's preference in sweets to tailor the candy to the tasting competition, and succeeded in winning the $25,000 bonus. This bonus helped them to win the task.; Losing team: Arete; Reasons for loss: Team Arete had raised $365,745.; Sent to boardroom: Ricky Williams, Jon Lovitz, Laila Ali; Terminated: Jon Lovitz—for raising the least amount of money on the team, which was $500. Boy George and Ricky Williams were the highest fundraisers on the team, while Brooke Burke-Chavet, Matt Iseman and Laila Ali raised more money than Jon. Laila was responsible for making the candy and was tasked for not researching what Buffett would prefer, which cost their chances of winning the $25,000 bonus, but defended her losing candy. Both were kept in jeopardy, and continued to point fingers at each other with Williams. Although Schwarzenegger kept criticizing Ricky Williams for not going full-throttle with the fundraising, in the end, Schwarzenegger almost terminated Williams but chose Jon Lovitz to be terminated. On top of that, he was disruptive and a weak link on Team Arete. While getting to the chopper in Omaha, Lovitz was using his comedy skill to get away from the chopper. Plus, he stated in his interview that he is not a good fundraiser.; NOTE: Arnold decided to switch up the teams since the women had lost four out of five tasks. Vince Neil, Carson Kressley and Chael Sonnen moved to Prima while Brooke Burke-Charvet and Laila Ali moved to Arete.; Cameo appearances by Kyle Richards, Carrot Top, Paul Kemsley and Sugar Ray Leonard also made a donation to Team Arete but didn't appear in the episode.
87	4	"Scissors and Some Creativity"	January 23, 2017	1504	3.90
Task 7: Task Scope: Lorissa's Food Brand—Teams were tasked for marketing a new product for a health food brand Lorissa's Kitchen.; Prima Project Manager: Lisa Leslie; Arete Project Manager: Brooke Burke-Charvet; Judges: Arnold Schwarzenegger, Bob Harper, Patrick Schwarzenegger; Winning team: Arete; Reasons for win: The executives like their “from the farm, to your table” feel of their setting. They felt that Brooke had a very authentic connection to the brand.; Losing team: Prima; Reasons for loss: Even though the executives loved Carson as an engaging host and the better space of the team's container display, they felt it was very chaotic of a party atmosphere, and the sexy-dance girls were cheap and off-brand.; Sent to boardroom: Lisa Leslie, Vince Neil, Chael Sonnen; Terminated: Vince Neil—although he won the last task and got more money for his charity, he was responsible for coming up with the ladies dancing idea, which the executives didn't like. Schwarzenegger called Leslie out for previously clashing with the all-women team and now with guys Sonnen and Neil, but also criticized the two men for not going above and beyond. But as Leslie and Sonnen battled, Neil stunned everyone by saying he himself should be terminated. And so, the boss terminated the rocker.; Task 8: Task Scope: Universal Studios Hollywood—Teams were tasked to create a digital brochure for the buzzworthy Harry Potter attraction at Universal Studios Hollywood.; Prima Project Manager: Carson Kressley; Arete Project Manager: Matt Iseman; Judges: Arnold Schwarzenegger, Tracey Edmonds, Patrick Schwarzenegger; Disqualified: Chael Sonnen—for cheating by cutting the computer cord to buy the team extra time to finish the task. He was fired before the winning and losing teams were announced in the boardroom. This is the second time a candidate/celebrity has been disqualified from this after Anand Vasudev in Season 10.; Winning team: Arete; Reasons for win: Matt Iseman, a self-admitted fan of Harry Potter, helped to lead an earnest and engaging live presentation, including an organic, creative digital brochure.; Losing team: Prima; Reasons for loss: The executives felt the concept of the digital brochure was too predictable and felt the team had an uninspired presentation. In the end, Team Prima missed the point of the task.; Sent to boardroom: No Final Boardroom; Terminated: Porsha Williams—for being a failure in the creative process in the task, and for talking too much in the boardroom to avoid answering the Governor's questions. Even though Carson was responsible for the teams' unsuccessful presentation, Schwarzenegger felt Carson has done very well in the competition. But Porsha's losing record (2-6) and too many words got her sent to the chopper.; NOTES: Boy George did not participate in this task due to a previous engagement.; Arnold told Chael "you're fired" rather than "you're terminated."
88	5	"I'm Going Full Ballmer"	January 30, 2017	1505	3.71
Task 9: Task Scope: Los Angeles Clippers -The teams have to create a high-energy presentation to promote the Clipper brand and fire up Clipper Nation during a timeout in a game, as well as designing a T-shirt for fans.; Prima Project Manager: Lisa Leslie; Arete Project Manager: Ricky Williams; Judges: Arnold Schwarzenegger, Steve Ballmer, Patrick Schwarzenegger; Winning team: Prima; Reasons for win: Although Lisa was criticized for not showing off her basketball skills, the original song created by Boy George proved popular with the audience, and their T-shirt was judged to be superior.; Losing team: Arete; Reasons for loss: Ballmer felt it wasn’t super creative that they used his line in a goofy manner; he feels they “hijacked” his words. He believed it started well, but they didn’t push for the crowd to chant more and it fell flat.; Sent to boardroom: Ricky Williams, Brooke Burke-Charvet, Laila Ali; Terminated: Ricky Williams—for his terrible project manager record (0-2). Though Laila Ali was criticized for showing no positive energy, she fought harder to stay than Ricky. Ricky was also fired for not pushing the concept far enough and for being a weak contributor for the majority of the recent tasks.; NOTE: Arnold moved Boy George to Prima to even out the teams.; Task 10: Task Scope: QVC- The teams had to pick a piece of fitness equipment and sell as many as they could on QVC live from Muscle Beach. The team that generates the most revenue wins.; Prima Project Manager: Carson Kressley; Arete Project Manager: Brooke Burke-Charvet; Judges: Arnold Schwarzenegger, Leeza Gibbons, Patrick Schwarzenegger; Winning team: Arete; Reasons for win: Arete sold 156 units for $17,158.; Losing team: Prima; Reasons for loss: Prima sold 88 units for a total of $8,798.; Sent to boardroom: No final boardroom; Terminated: Carson Kressley—for not having Lisa sell the equipment like Leeza Gibbons suggested, his second loss as project manager (1-2), and leading his team to a crushing defeat.; Lisa Leslie—for being a weak sound producer for the sales segment (e.g. not coordinated well with the sales graphs), not being the sales pitch that Leeza Gibbons suggested, having a team record of 3–7, and coming back to the boardroom five times.; NOTES: Arnold told Carson and Lisa "you're fired" rather than "you're terminated".; Boy George was the only person on Team Prima because he was not responsible for the loss.
89	6	"Bon Voyage"	February 6, 2017	1506	3.48
Task 11: Task Scope: The Honest Company—Each team of two was tasked with creating an in-home demonstration showcasing products from the Honest Company, with the company's founder Jessica Alba watching.; Prima Project Manager: Boy George; Arete Project Manager: Laila Ali; Judges: Arnold Schwarzenegger, Jessica Alba, Patrick Schwarzenegger; Winning team: Prima; Reasons for win: Jessica Alba liked the background music, their depiction of a married couple, and their risk-taking, but thought they lacked the takeaways about The Honest Company. But still, they liked it more than ever.; Losing team: Arete; Reasons for loss: Jessica Alba felt it was concise, hit the product uses, and had tangible takeaways, but it wasn't really creative in the presenting of the company.; Sent to boardroom: No Final Boardroom; Terminated: Laila Ali—for not going out of her comfort zone. Schwarzenegger had no reason to fire Matt because he was very good in the whole competition. Iseman's acknowledged was inauthentic, but put the lack of creativity on Ali, who insisted she was the “stronger” competitor to move on. Obviously, they both thought the other should be fired, and Iseman pointed out that this was only his first time in jeopardy. Ultimately, Schwarzenegger told Ali, “You’re terminated.”; NOTE: Schwarzenegger moved Brooke Burke-Charvet back to Team Prima with Boy George to even out the teams.; Task 12: Schwarzenegger called the three finalists back to the boardroom and asked the three who should stay. In the end, the Governor fired Brooke Burke-Charvet.; Terminated: Brooke Burke-Charvet—although the Governor had praised Boy George, Matt Iseman and Brooke Burke-Chavet. Each had won two times as project manager, though Iseman and Boy George were neck-and-neck with their win–loss records (7-4 vs. 7-3). All three had to convince Schwarzenegger why they should go on to the finale. But Schwarzenegger felt that Brooke was a little bit off the edge.; Finalists: Boy George and Matt Iseman; Final Task Scope: Carnival Corporation—expected to create an ad campaign, host a party and produce a variety show that can't be accomplished without some familiar faces.; Matt's Team: Carrie Keagan, Kyle Richards, Carnie Wilson; Boy George's Team: Laila Ali, Carson Kressley, Porsha Williams; Task Tension: On Boy George's team, The keyboardist arrives to work with Boy George composing and writing two songs. He is getting frustrated that he isn’t playing what he needs to play and giving it too much personality. He stands up and walks out of the room, telling the producers the keyboardist needs to go and they need to replace him. Boy George gets frustrated and says he can’t be wasting time right now. He tells the producers that he is not going back into the room to have a row with the guy for their pleasure, and orders them to get rid of him or he will leave the show. Porsha is asked to remove the keyboardist and she does. Meanwhile on Matt Iseman's team, Matt continues to struggle with creativity but tells his team he is open to suggestions. He also tells his team they need to finish their ad, as that is their main priority. Carrie is to focus on going through the photos and choosing the best one. Kyle is responsible for the party layout and their different spaces. Carnie is in charge of food and entertainment, suggesting Wilson Phillips will be performing. Matt is working on the fundraising, strongly believing Boy George will easily blow past $500,000. He wants to prove the Governor wrong, who feels Matt won’t be able to raise the funds. He also worries about letting down his charity and promises to give it everything he has.; NOTE: Brooke's termination marks the end of the original Prima members. Both finalists are from the same original team (Arete).; Curtis Stone makes an appearance on the show. He helps Boy George's Team to do a photo shoot. He gets Porsha and Carson out of the dining room before they can drink too much alcohol. George is happy they got what they came for.
90	7	"I Have No Time For Anyone's Ego Except My Own"	February 13, 2017	1507	3.48
Judges: Arnold Schwarzenegger, Tyra Banks, Patrick Schwarzenegger; Celebrity Apprentice: Matt Iseman; Reasons for win: Team Matt raised $573,329. Schwarzenegger picked him because he had been solid the entire season. Tyra Banks mentioned that in the beginning of the season she had said he was the one to watch.; Runner-Up: Boy George; Reasons for loss: Team Boy George raised $445,925. Although he won as the project manager in the first task and did nearly as well as Matt, he raised less money. The Governor said he had his up and downs but he overcame them.; NOTES: Both teams did an excellent job, so the Governor and his advisors praised a lot of things to each team.; Cameo appearances by Wilson Phillips, Natasha Bedingfield, and Caitlyn Jenner

== Reception ==
The season received an overwhelmingly negative response and Donald Trump mocked Arnold Schwarzenegger multiple times regarding the season's low ratings, saying he was a poor fit for the show and was not a good host compared to himself. Katz Television Group's Bill Carroll stated, "Arnold Schwarzenegger was fine, but it was a different dynamic. The Apprentice in the United States was Trump. From the opening credits—the Trump helicopter, the Trump plane, Trump buildings, it was so identified with Trump and his personality that it's difficult to recast."
