= Gemma Godfrey =

British wealth manager and entrepreneur

Gemma Godfrey (also known as Gemma Claire) is a British wealth manager and entrepreneur. She founded Moola, an online investment service in the UK which closed down in 2020, and was hired as Arnold Schwarzenegger's adviser on the US edition of "The New Celebrity Apprentice" in 2016.

== Education ==
Gemma was educated at North London Collegiate School and graduated in 2001. She then subsequently enrolled in a Bachelor of Science in Physics and Philosophy at the University of Leeds and graduated in 2004.

== Awards and nominations ==
She was selected as one of BBC'S 100 Women and as City of London Wealth Management Awards "Industry Commentator of the year" in 2013. In 2014 she was a finalist for the 6th Shorty Awards for social media Business Influencer Award.
