= Mireya Mayor =

American anthropologist and wildlife correspondent

Mireya Mayor (born 1973) is an American anthropologist, primatologist, and wildlife correspondent for National Geographic, part of a research expedition that discovered a new species of lemur, considered the world's smallest primate. She has co-written several scientific papers on lemur species, and has been referred to as the "female Indiana Jones." In 2026, Mayor received the inaugural Voice of Discovery Award from the non-profit WINGS Women of Discovery.

== Early life and education ==
Mayor, born in 1973, grew up in Miami and was raised by her mother, grandmother, and aunt, who had emigrated to the U.S. from Cuba in 1965. Her mother, a nurse, would not allow her to join the Girl Scouts, saying it was too dangerous.

She studied at the University of Miami where she obtained her bachelor's degree in anthropology and philosophy, and for four years was a cheerleader for the NFL Miami Dolphins.

Mayor, a Fulbright Scholar and a National Science Foundation fellow, earned her PhD in anthropology from Stony Brook University in New York in 2008.

== Career ==
In 1999, Mayor was hired as the first female wildlife correspondent for the National Geographic series Ultimate Explorer. Two episodes she hosted, "Girl Power" and "Into the Lost World", received Emmy Award nominations for Outstanding Science, Technology and Nature Programming.

On a 2001 expedition in Madagascar, she was part of a research group who described a new species of mouse lemur, Microcebus mittermeieri, or Mittermeier's mouse lemur, after Russell Mittermeier, the president of green group Conservation International and a renowned field primatologist. Mayor told NPR in a 2015 interview that following the discovery, she persuaded the prime minister of Madagascar to declare the mouse lemur's habitat a national park.

In 2009, she was cast in the Mark Burnett-produced miniseries Expedition Africa on the History Channel, which retraced H.M. Stanley's expedition through Tanzania to find David Livingstone.

In 2019, she was cast in the Travel Channel documentary series Expedition Bigfoot, in which she and other wildlife researchers spent three weeks in the Pacific Northwest searching for evidence that Bigfoot exists. The first season aired in January 2020 and in 2025 was in its sixth season.

In October 2019, Mayor began to direct the Exploration and Science Communications Initiative at Florida International University.

In September 2022, she was the subject of the children's book, "Just Wild Enough: Mireya Mayor, Primatologist".

== Personal life ==
Mireya Mayor has six children, five from her first marriage and one with her second husband, Phil Fairclough, who is an executive producer.

In 2018, her home was in Great Falls, Virginia.

== Publications ==
- Mayor, M. (2011). Pink Boots and a Machete: My Journey from NFL Cheerleader to National Geographic Explorer. United States: National Geographic.
- Scientific publications co-authored by Mireya Mayor
