= Backpack journalism =

Solo multirole multimedia reporting

Backpack journalism, also a reporter called as backpack reporting, is an emerging form of journalism that requires a journalist to be a reporter, photographer, and videographer, as well as an editor and producer of stories. There is no set definition for this practice, but it is essentially "a method using ... journalism to create powerful, intimate stories that take people beyond the boundary of their own life experience and connect them with the currents, forces and situations reshaping our world on a daily basis." This method uses various media tools, such as lightweight laptops, satellite phones, inexpensive editing software and digital cameras to more fully engage both the audience's intellect and emotion. Backpack journalists file material to supply the Web, and occasionally television, from locations that would be otherwise inaccessible to large news teams (e.g. in war zones and as well as in areas hit by natural disasters). Although the term originated within the sphere of broadcast journalism, it has expanded to include all areas of the media world.

An accomplished backpack journalist must be a master of new technologies, capable of fusing previously separated roles, such as writer and videographer, and able to produce a story that ensures accuracy, fairness and balance, shaped by high standards and solidified practices.

According to pioneer backpack journalist Jane Stevens, backpack journalists must also "know the difference between when you're a lone wolf and when you're part of a greater whole."

Backpack journalism is being used by print publication staffs to create visual journalism for websites, by broadcast operations to offer unique content, and by freelance journalists who recognize its value to tell stories and present evidence and testimony for media and non-media clients. News directors are finding this style of journalism beneficial to their organizations. Instead of requiring cameramen, reporters and editors to produce news stories, a larger group of employees who can do all of the above are available, which can double or even triple the number of stories that can be covered. The various platforms involved with this type of reporting also opens more doors for reaching a broader and more varied audience.

== History ==
In the United States, backpack journalism is said to have evolved out of Video News International (VNI), a project by The New York Times, in the mid-1990s. Michael Rosenblum, a former broadcast journalist, thought that training print journalists and photographers to use small high-quality digital video cameras would encourage television networks to do more international coverage because it would be more cost effective.

After September 11, 2001, multiple news organizations created specific websites to share continuing developments after the terrorist attack. These sites told the stories of what happened on that day, supplemented by slide shows and video of the events of September 11, information about Afghanistan, Pakistan, the history of terrorism, and links pointing to outside resources.

Other news organizations, such as the American Broadcasting Company (ABC) and the National Broadcasting Company (NBC), set out to compete with these sites, and so backpack journalism spurred further into being.

== Differences from print or television ==
Print (text, still photos, graphics) and television (video, audio, animated graphics) tell stories linearly. Both these mediums are one-way systems because they offer the reader or viewer little opportunity for feedback. Both are also temporal – "the newspaper becomes fishwrap; television's news disappears into the ether."

Multimedia storytelling – the heart of backpack journalism – uses a combination of text, still photos, animated graphics, video and audio presented in a nonlinear format in which all of the information in the elements are non-redundant. This method provides a two-way communications system, in which consumers can search for information, submit their own text, photos, graphics, video clips and audio to comment on stories, or provide additional information to the story.

Print publications and television stations alone cannot provide as much information around each story as multimedia storytelling can. The characteristics of multimedia journalism will change how beats, or areas of the news, are covered and will expand news coverage.

== Media convergence ==
Media convergence is the "coming together of all forms of mediated communication." The key place that all media – print, audio, and video – comes together today is the Internet. Through the advent of the Internet, print publications are able to supplement their print stories with audio and video. Video news finds its print counterpart in the text capabilities of the Web. Radio stations are able to use the Web to stream live and archive their audio, and enhance their audio with print versions of their stories.

News organizations worldwide have been embracing convergence at different speeds in comparison to the United States. In 2001, Dr. Juan Antonio Giner, founder of Innovation International media consulting group, wrote that "media diversification is the past. Digital convergence is the present. Multimedia integration is the future." Years later, Giner's words have proven to be true. The journalism world has been transformed into a 24-hour information business that takes advantage of virtually every form of technology available.

Backpack journalism is a prime example of media convergence since it makes use of all types of media – audio, visual and written. Journalists practicing this method of reporting must be proficient in all of these areas in order to effectively communicate their story.

== Future ==
Some producers see the method as "a key to unlocking new techniques of storytelling; enabling a way to move past the image conventions and story lines that have defined journalistic storytelling in mass media during the last part of the 20th century." Backpack journalism is the inevitable future of the industry due to the faltering world economy – "expand your skill sets or it's game over." Others within the field, however, see the "one-man band" method of storytelling as dangerous to reporting itself, because information or quality may be sacrificed without the expertise a full team can provide.

More traditional journalists say there are few opportunities for employment in the news industry, and that even being trained in new technology and methods will not aid in securing a job. They also view backpack journalism as a threat to the responsibilities of fair, balanced, and accurate news that journalists hold to their audience. Lou Ureneck, chairman of Boston University's journalism department, said that the multi-tasking backpack journalism requires has a "flattening effect" on the quality of reporting; it does not allow the reporter to focus on the individual steps required for producing a story. Ureneck says that being a reporter is a "fully engaging task."

Those seeking to enter the journalism field in the present and future will be affected by the backpack journalism practice because of media convergence. The people who can "do it all ... are the journalists of the future," said John Schidlovsky, director of the Pew Fellowship in International Journalism. Advocates of this new model argue that it will be impossible to survive in the journalism field if a reporter cannot shift from medium to medium, and take control of their own stories. However, "clear writing and the provision of context and background will remain fundamental to the journalist's role." This means that regardless of what happens with technological advances in the future, journalists will still need the building blocks of journalistic writing style in order to stay afloat in the field. Similar to how newsrooms made the transition from typewriters to computers over the past 20 years, so will they adjust to the new convergence and multimedia presence within the industry; just as it would be unfathomable today to hire a reporter without knowledge of a computer, it will be unheard of to hire a reporter 20 years from now who cannot slide across different media. Alexandra Wallace, senior vice president of NBC News, said "as long as you can keep quality and quantity up, the reality is it takes fewer people to do what it took many people to do, and that's really, truly based on technology."

Jane Stevens wrote that over the next 20 years, if economic conditions do not worsen and technological developments continue apace, the content of newspapers and television news shows are likely to be delivered principally over the Internet. Stories will include breaking news, daily stories, features, and in-depth reporting. Breaking news, daily stories and some features will be delivered as short video spots, and combinations of text and visuals in updated news packages that the audience checks throughout the day.

The news organizations that thrive in a converged world, Steven said, will have a myriad of different methods for producing stories, but basically the models will break down to producer-driver and reporter-driven stories.

Producer-driven stories will work best for breaking news and much daily news content. A producer-driven story is one in which the producer of a converged news operation sends out a team of reporters to hunt down the story and gather information. The reporters file what's in front of them, and don't know how much of their contribution will end up being published, or in what form.

A reporter-driven story, however, is one in which a reporter or small team of reporters puts together a package whose content they essentially control from beginning to end. One element of the package may be very dramatic still photos with audio and text. Another element may be a biting analysis, in text augmented by a few video clips. The main part may comprise integrated text, video clips, graphics, interactivity.

Journalism schools around the United States have developed programs around multimedia journalism and backpacking, in order to train tomorrow's journalists for the industry that awaits them. It has become relatively standard practice to require print journalism majors to take courses in radio and TV news and multimedia, as well as requiring multimedia majors to take courses in radio and TV and print journalism.

American University's school of communication is home to Bill Gentile and Thomas Kennedy's Backpack Journalism Project. The aim of the project is to promote the sense of authorship to practitioners of backpack journalism, to identify trends and best practices of the backpack journalism model, to impact decisions of managers and editors regarding implementation of the model, to reach a broad audience interested in powerful stories about key issues, and to reach creators and distributors of new visual communication platforms that desire powerful content for their news organizations.
