= Michael Rosenblum =

American television producer and video journalist

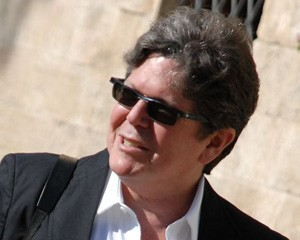
- Born: 1954 (age 71–72)
- Occupations: Television producer; Video journalist; Author

Michael Rosenblum (born 1954) is a television producer and video journalist (VJ) who built the first major VJ-driven local TV news operation at NY1. He later went on to train VJs at Voice of America, The New York Times, the BBC, News10, McGraw Hill, German Public TV, Dutch Public TV and many other VJ-driven news operations around the world. He was both the founder and first president of New York Times Television.

Rosenblum has produced a number of television shows, including: 5 Takes: Latin America (2007), What's Your Trip (2007), Let the Good Times Roll Again (2007), 5 Takes: USA (2006), Turning the Tide: Tsunami Volunteers (2005), Trauma: Life in the ER, Paramedics, Police Force, Labor and Delivery, and Science Times.

Rosenblum was part of the foundation of Current TV and the Travel Channel Academy. "he has developed a unique and radical vision for television news based on the concept of the "video journalist".

He is the CEO of RosenblumTV, a production company focused on VJ model programming and video boot camps for aspiring VJs, as well as the Travel Channel Academy, NYVS (an online film school), and the Brussels-based Rosenblum Institute. He launched outwildtv.com, a new network modeled on National Geographic.

He is the author of iPhone Millionaire: How to Create and Sell Cutting-Edge Video (2012) and Videojournalismus (2003).

== Education ==
Rosenblum is a 1972 graduate of Lawrence High School, New York and a 1976 graduate of Williams College.

== Publications ==
- How to Make Your First Million Dollars: In 9 Simple Lessons. 2024. ISBN 978-1835561737.
- iPhone Millionaire: How to Create and Sell Cutting-Edge Video. McGraw Hill, 2012. ISBN 978-0071800174.
- Videojournalismus:: Die digitale Revolution. 2003. ISBN 978-3937151106. German.
