= Kevin Sites =

American journalist (born 1963 or 1964)

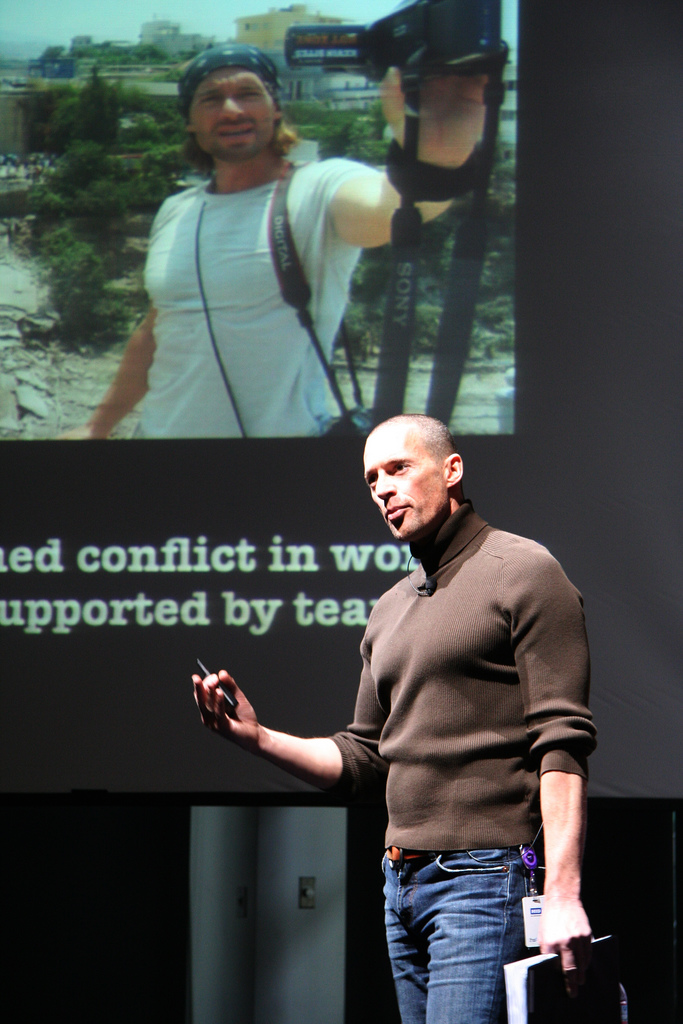
- Kevin Sites speaking about his then-new book at a Yahoo! conference.
- Born: 1963/4; Geneva, Ohio, United States
- Occupations: Author; Freelance journalist
- Website: kevinsitesreports.com

Kevin Sites (born 1963/1964) is an American author and freelance journalist. He has spent nearly a decade covering news for global wars and disasters for ABC, NBC, CNN, and Yahoo! News. Dubbed by the trade press as the "granddaddy" of backpack journalists, Sites helped blaze the trail for intrepid reporters who work alone, carrying only a backpack of portable digital devices to shoot, write, edit, and transmit multimedia reports from the world's most dangerous places. His first book, In the Hot Zone: One Man, One Year, Twenty Wars (Harper Perennial-October 2007), shares his effort to put a human face on global conflict by reporting from every major war zone in one year.

In 2009, Sites was one of four cast members of the reality television series Expedition Africa on the History channel. The eight-part series followed Sites and three explorers as they retraced the journey of Henry Morton Stanley in his quest to find David Livingstone. It was this journey that allegedly ended with the famous phrase, "Dr. Livingstone, I presume?"

== Background and journalism career ==
While Sites spent most of his early career producing and reporting for television network news with staff positions at ABC, NBC and CNN, he left traditional network broadcasting behind for the internet in 2005, and was hired by Yahoo! to be its first correspondent for Yahoo! News. He spent one year traveling to all the major war zones in the world, reporting for his website "Kevin Sites in the Hot Zone", unique at the time for its multi-media mix of text, video and still images in its storytelling.

As a pioneer of the "SoJo" method of solo journalism/video journalism, or backpack journalism, Sites helped to galvanize the idea of the modern, mobile digital correspondent, traveling and reporting without a crew, carrying a backpack of portable digital technology to write, videotape and transmit his multimedia reports.

Sites' assignments have brought him to nearly every region of the world, including Africa, the Middle East, Southeast Asia, Central Asia, South America, and Eastern Europe.

Sites grew up in Ohio and currently lives in Hong Kong. He is now a professor at the Journalism and Media Studies Centre of the University of Hong Kong teaching bachelor and masters programmes.

== Reporting from the Middle East ==
On April 11, 2003, as a CNN correspondent in Iraq, Sites was captured by Saddam Hussein's Fedayeen militia. One day after they were captured, their Kurdish translator negotiated their release.

In November 2004, as an embedded correspondent for NBC, he recorded a US Marine shooting and killing a wounded and apparently unarmed Iraqi captive lying on the floor in a mosque in Fallujah. After the footage was released to the television network pool, all the American television networks censored the actual shooting, while other international media outlets broadcast the uncut version. Sites received both adulation and hate mail for taping the video. In his book, Sites says he initially supported censoring the video to avoid a possible violent backlash, but writes that he quickly realized that it was the wrong decision and helped confuse the American public by not giving them the full context of the shooting through the uncensored videotape. A few days after the shooting, Sites reported the story again in his personal blog, giving a detailed account of what he witnessed and explaining his reasons for releasing the video. The Marine was not charged in the shooting, and further investigations became impossible when a Marine Corps jet destroyed the mosque a few days later. A Marine spokesperson says it was not deliberately targeted.

== Kevin Sites in the Hot Zone ==
In late 2005, Sites set out to cover every warzone in the world for Yahoo! News. The coverage was published on a website called "Kevin Sites in the Hot Zone". According to the Hot Zone page, Sites' mission was "to cover every armed conflict in the world within one year, and in doing so to provide a clear idea of the combatants, victims, causes, and costs of each of these struggles – and their global impact."

The Hot Zone project concluded with Sites' coverage of the Israeli-Hezbollah conflict of 2006. Currently, updates on Hot Zone stories and themes are periodically posted on the Hot Zone page. Recent posts include an update on Sites' most popular story from the Hot Zone, a report on an Afghan child bride.

== People of the Web ==
After the Hot Zone project was completed, Sites began working on a domestic feature series profiling the unique voices from the online world, called "People of the Web." A new profile was posted every week until the series was discontinued in 2008.

== Awards and recognition ==
Sites was recently selected as a 2010 Nieman Fellow, a prestigious journalism fellowship at Harvard University. In September 2008, Sites was awarded Manchester College's 2008 Innovator of the Year Award.

Sites was honored with the Payne Award for Ethics in Journalism for the mosque video and was additionally nominated for the national Emmy Award. Sites was also honored by Wired magazine, receiving the magazine's RAVE Award for his popular blog. He was also awarded the Daniel Pearl Award, for courage and integrity in journalism, by the Los Angeles Press Club in 2006.

He won the Edward R. Murrow Award in 1999 for his contributions to NBC's coverage of the war in Kosovo.
