= Tom Scott (presenter) =

English presenter (born 1980s)

- Scott in 2026
- Born: Thomas Scott; 1984 or 1985 (age 41–42)
- Education: University of York
- Occupations: Presenter; YouTuber

YouTube information
- Channel: Tom Scott
- Years active: 2006–present
- Genres: Factual; education; science; geography; comedy
- Subscribers: 6.75 million
- Views: 1.97 billion
- Tom Scott's voice Scott talking in an interview at TEDxLiverpool in 2011
- Last updated: 4 November 2026
- Website: tomscott.com

Thomas Scott (born 1984 or 1985) is an English presenter, podcaster, YouTuber, and former web developer. On his self-titled YouTube channel, active since 2014, Scott creates educational videos across a range of topics including history, geography, linguistics, science, and technology. As of November 2026, his five YouTube channels have collectively gained over 8.16 million subscribers (Note: Subscribers, broken down by channel: 6.75 million (Tom Scott); 832 thousand (Tom Scott plus); 252 thousand (Matt and Tom); 178 thousand (The Technical Difficulties); 155 thousand (Lateral with Tom Scott)) and 2.12 billion views. (Note: Views, broken down by channel: 1.97 billion (Tom Scott); 56.96 million (Tom Scott plus); 49.67 million (Matt and Tom); 8.72 million (The Technical Difficulties); 33.67 million (Lateral with Tom Scott))

Scott first came to media attention as a student, creating a parody of a governmental website. He created his channel in 2006, but only began to enjoy mainstream popularity after 2014, when he began his education series Things You Might Not Know. Scott produced and uploaded educational videos to the channel across a range of topics including linguistics, technology, geography, history, and science.

His output has included series such as Language Files (which focuses on linguistics and languages), The Basics (computing and IT), Amazing Places (geographical locations), and Things You Might Not Know. Some of his videos have received external coverage, including colours unable to be recorded accurately on video, compact hovercraft, and how bear-resistant infrastructure is tested.

Scott has also collaborated with other YouTubers, including through his Tom Scott plus channel, several comedy series with The Technical Difficulties, and the brain-teaser podcast Lateral. In January 2024 he took a break from a decade-long schedule of consistent weekly uploads in order to focus on other projects. He returned to weekly YouTube uploads in March 2026 with the release of his unscripted series, Tom Scott: England.

== Early life ==
Thomas Scott was born in 1984 or 1985 and grew up in Mansfield, Nottinghamshire. He graduated from the University of York with a degree in linguistics and English language. He then studied a two-year part-time research Master of Arts in educational studies, graduating in the early 2000s.

In 2010, Scott took part in series 3 of Only Connect, as the team captain of the Hitchhikers, as well as the two "Wall Night" special episodes the following year. In December 2022, he appeared in two episodes of Christmas University Challenge as captain of the University of York team.

== Career ==
=== Early career ===
==== Mad Cap'n Tom ====
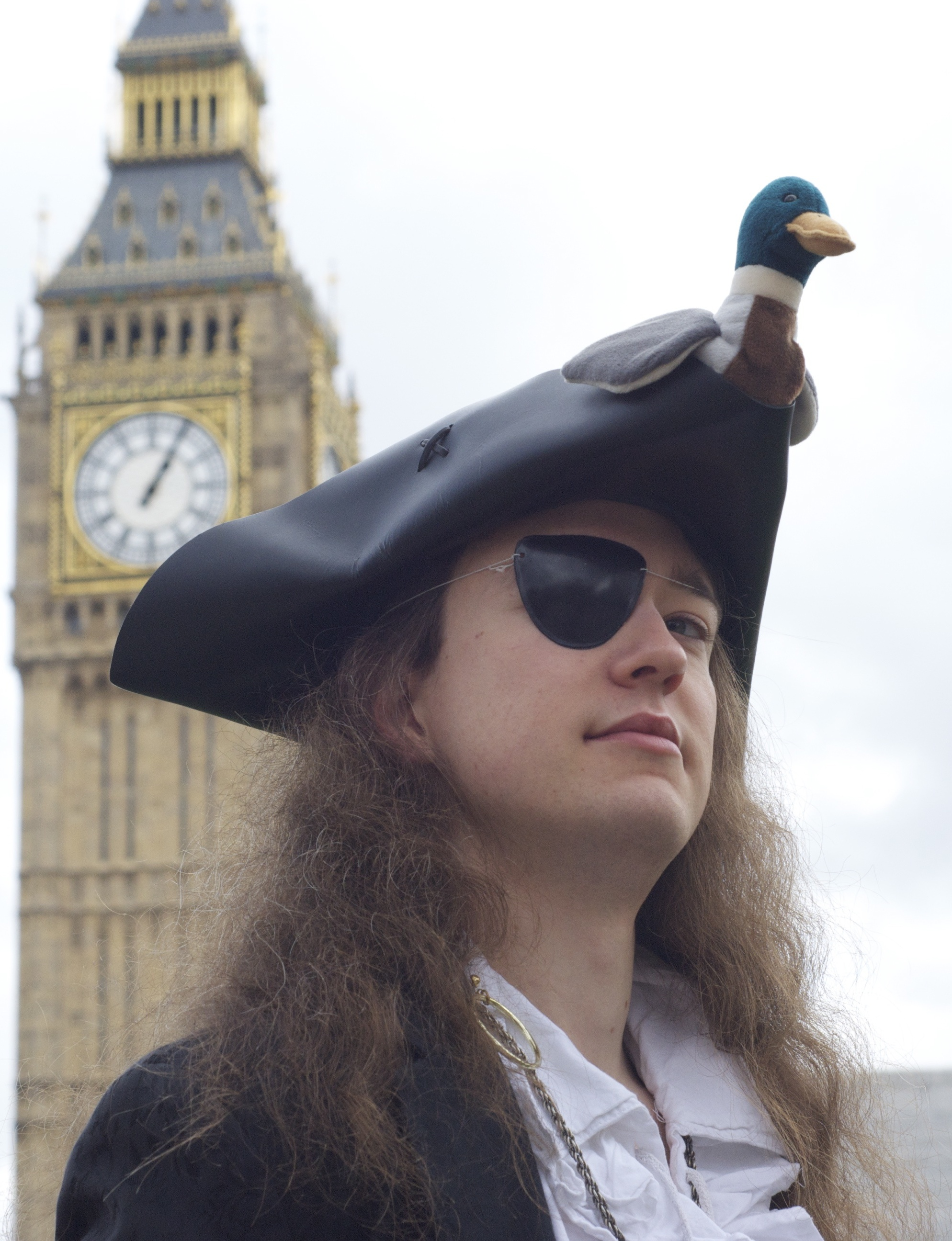
Scott as "Mad Cap'n Tom" in 2010

In 2003, Scott became the organiser of the British section of International Talk Like a Pirate Day. In 2008, Scott was nominated by his friends to run for student president at the University of York Students' Union, under the guise of his Talk Like a Pirate Day persona, "Mad Cap'n Tom Scott". Despite running as a joke, he gained almost 3,000 votes, won the election, and served as the organisation's 48th president.

In 2010, as part of losing a bet regarding the results of Super Bowl XLIV, Scott ran for Parliament in the Cities of London and Westminster constituency as a joke candidate, again using the character. At the time, he described his chances of winning in the safe Conservative seat of Westminster as "Somewhere 'twixt a snowball's chance in hell an' zero." He finished in last place, behind Pirate Party UK, gaining 84 votes (0.2% of the total).

==== Web development and TV presenting ====
In 2004, when Scott was 19 and at university, he produced a website parodying the British government's "Preparing for Emergencies" website, including a section explaining what to do in case of a zombie apocalypse. This resulted in the Cabinet Office demanding the site be deleted, to which Scott sent a "polite response declining to take down the site".

In 2012, Scott was a presenter in the Sky 1 series Gadget Geeks alongside Colin Furze and Creative Technologist Charles Yarnold, where he was responsible for the creation of software solutions. He also worked creating Flash games for the Daily Mirror's UsVsTh3m website. These included a viral "North-O-Meter" which judged its players' northernness.

Scott received coverage in 2013 for "Actual Facebook Graph Searches", a Tumblr site which exposed a potentially embarrassing and dangerous collection of public Facebook data using Facebook's Graph Search, though Scott redacted the identities of the people included on the page.

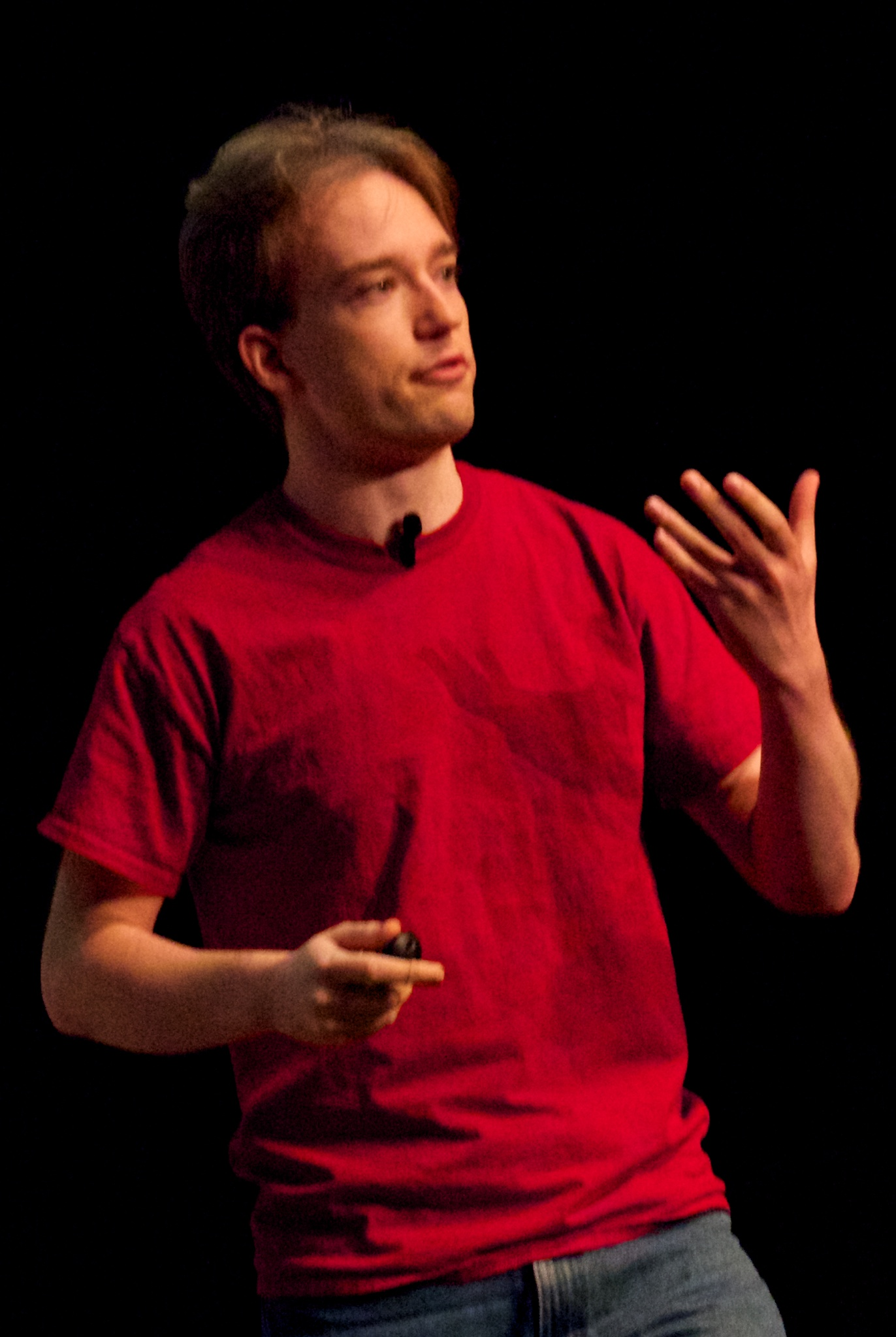
Scott at dConstruct in 2014

In 2014, Scott co-founded Emojli along with Natalie Gray. It was a parody emoji-only social network inspired by Yo. Emojli was described by Salon as "an inside joke turned into reality". It closed in July 2015 after it became too expensive to maintain. In September 2015, Scott created a full-size emoji keyboard out of fourteen standard keyboards to type every standard Unicode emoji.

Other web apps Scott has created include "Evil", a web app that revealed the phone numbers of Facebook users; "Tweleted", which showed posts deleted from Twitter; "What's Osama bin Watchin?", which mashed together an image of Osama bin Laden with YouTube Internet memes; "Parliament WikiEdits", a Twitter bot that tweets whenever an IP address from the Houses of Parliament edited Wikipedia, which inspired a wave of similar accounts including CongressEdits; and "Klouchebag", a satire of the social media rankings site Klout.

=== YouTube career ===
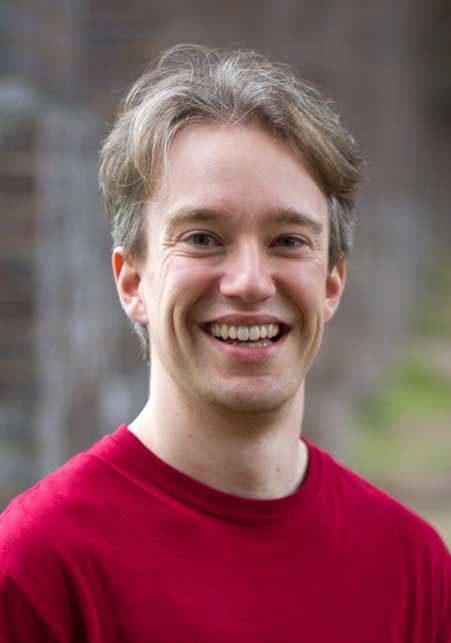
Scott in 2016

Scott produces and uploads educational videos to the channel across a range of topics including linguistics, technology, geography, history, and science. His work has included series including the languages and linguistics focused Language Files, computing and information technology based The Basics, Amazing Places, and Things You Might Not Know. Some of his videos have received external coverage, including colours unable to be recorded accurately on video, compact hovercraft, and how bear-resistant infrastructure is tested. Scott has also collaborated with other YouTubers, including challenging YouTuber Jordan Harrod to create a deepfake version of him for $100.

In 2022, Scott won the Streamy Award for Learning and Education. He was nominated in the same category in 2023.

==== Hiatus ====
Scott announced that he was taking a break from his YouTube work starting 1 January 2024, after a decade of consistent weekly uploads. "I am so tired. There's nothing in my life right now except work," he explained, although it was his "dream job". Scott believed YouTube made it impossible to maintain the quality of his videos. Thus he saw his only other option as expanding further and hiring staff, forcing him to "become a manager", which he deemed beyond his skills. Soon after, he noted that other YouTubers with similar long-form content were also reducing or stepping away as views and ad-revenue fall. Scott predicted "difficult years" ahead given the rise of "junk zero-effort generative AI channels" and competing video options.

In 2025, Scott competed with Sam Denby in the thirteenth season of the Nebula series Jet Lag: The Game, in a race against Adam Chase and Ben Doyle to claim the most countries in the Schengen Area within six days. This was his second appearance on Nebula, following his series Tom Scott Presents: Money. In 2026, Scott returned as a competitor on the nineteenth season of Jet Lag: The Game, which was set in Japan.

==== Tom Scott: England series ====
Scott released his first video on the YouTube channel since the break on 23 March 2026, announcing an unscripted 41-episode series called Tom Scott: England. The series documents an eight-week road trip, with each episode featuring one of the historic counties of England. The first episode, titled "I Helped Break a 142-Year-Old Bell, and That's Okay", was released on Nebula on the same day as the announcement; episodes are published weekly on Nebula, followed by an edited version a week later on YouTube. By this time, his YouTube channel had 6.6 million subscribers.

=== The Technical Difficulties ===
Scott is a member of the four-person comedy troupe The Technical Difficulties, with Natalie Gray, Gary Brannan, and Chris Joel. The group hosted a radio show of the same name on University Radio York, which won the Kevin Greening award at the Student Radio Awards in 2008. The Technical Difficulties have created several podcasts and video series over the years, using a variety of formats in which the members typically challenge each other with information about obscure topics.

Series	Duration
The Technical Difficulties (Note: Also known as The Reverse Trivia Podcast.)	2010–2014
Citation Needed	2014–2018
The Experiments	2018
Two of These People Are Lying	2019–2021
Adventures	2022–2023
Reverse Trivia	2024–2025
One of These People Is Lying	2026–present

=== Lateral with Tom Scott ===
Lateral with Tom Scott is a weekly comedy podcast taking the format of a game show where Scott and three contestants take turns asking each other difficult questions that require lateral thinking to answer, which was adapted from a 2018 six-episode game show on Scott's main YouTube channel that was also co-developed with David Bodycombe. Scott stated in an interview with IGN that the show was inspired by QI. In November 2024, a puzzle book was released, featuring questions and clues from the podcast so fans can play their own version of the game. Scott has continued the podcast, despite pausing his weekly YouTube release schedule. The show was performed live at the 2024 Cheerful Earful podcast festival, and again in 2025.

== Discography ==
List of singles, with selected details
Title	Artist(s)	Year	Ref.
"On a Pirate Ship"	Jay Foreman featuring Mad Cap'n Tom	2007	
"Shelter Me from the Rain"	Beardyman featuring MC HyperScott	2022	
