= Jet Lag: The Game =

Travel competition web series

- Genre: Reality competition; Travel
- Created by: Sam Denby; Adam Chase; Ben Doyle
- Starring: Sam Denby; Adam Chase; Ben Doyle
- Narrated by: Sam Denby
- Original language: English
- No. of seasons: 19 (Note: The Hide + Seek NYC special is not included in the seasons count; however, its episodes are included in the episodes count.)
- No. of episodes: 120 (Note: The Magic: The Gathering crossover special is not counted in the total number of episodes.)

Production
- Executive producers: Sam Denby; Adam Chase; Ben Doyle; Graham Haerther
- Running time: 20–82 minutes
- Production company: Wendover Productions

Original release
- Network: Nebula; YouTube
- Release: May 25, 2022 – present

Jet Lag: The Game is an American travel competition video series by Wendover Productions published on Nebula and YouTube. Created by and starring Sam Denby, Adam Chase, and Ben Doyle, the series launched in May 2022. Each season features a game that sends players to achieve a geographical objective in some part of the world, some of which are inspired by playground and board games. Some seasons also feature other content creators as guest competitors, such as Brian McManus, Toby Hendy, Michelle Khare, and Tom Scott.

During seasons, episodes are published weekly on Nebula, and a week later on YouTube. As of October 2026, Wendover has produced nineteen seasons of the series, and the channel on YouTube has amassed over 1 million subscribers. The Jet Lag crew also produces a companion podcast, called The Layover, where additional behind-the-scenes discussion takes place involving the gameplay experience and design of the season. The show was nominated for a Streamy Award in 2023, and received a popular-vote Webby Award in 2025.

== Gameplay ==
Each season features a game structure adapted to the geographic area and transportation modalities available in its filming location. These games have included requiring the players to visit and claim regions across countries or continents; play tag or hide-and-seek across countries; or race between the geographical extremes of countries, amongst others. Players must often endure randomly assigned restrictions to progress through the game. These restrictions may be in the form of a challenge, requiring the player to perform a certain task before progressing. It may also be in the form of a curse, which restricts their travel or adds a distracting element to the game. Depending on the format of the game, the players may be able to track each other to monitor their location. Most games primarily involve travel by trains, planes, and walking; they occasionally use buses, ferries, and other modes of local travel. In locations where public transit options are limited, they have used cars, but the producers feel doing so is less "strategically exciting" than using scheduled public transit.

Team format changes across seasons, depending on the structure of the game. In three-player games, two of them form a team, while the other player is on their own, rotating roles when the solo player is caught/found. In seasons where the trio are joined by a guest, Chase and Doyle typically compete as one team, while Denby allies with the guest. In the game involving three guests, each was paired with one of the regular players. The series's guests have included Brian McManus, Toby Hendy, Michelle Khare, and Tom Scott, among other content creators.

== Production ==
(Left to right) Ben Doyle, Sam Denby, and Adam Chase, pictured in August 2026, created the show.

Jet Lag: The Game was created by Sam Denby, founder of Wendover Productions and chief content officer of streaming platform Nebula, with writers Adam Chase and Ben Doyle, all of whom compete each season. The first season was released on May 25, 2022. The show is created primarily for streaming on Nebula, which supports its relatively expensive per-video budget. Episodes are released first on Nebula and a week later on YouTube. They typically release four seasons a year, overlapping the planning, recording, and editing of each season with those before and after.

Jet Lag's format was partially developed during a previous Wendover Productions show, Half as Interesting's Crime Spree, which had Chase and Doyle pursuing Denby as he attempted to break obscure laws in US states. Denby has also cited The Amazing Race and Taskmaster as inspirations for some of the show's various game mechanics.

Locations are chosen based on the availability of "strong, frequent, reliable, or semi-reliable, public transportation", according to Denby. Consequently, the most common regions have been Europe, North America, and East Asia. To address the climate impacts of the show's use of air travel, Wendover purchases Gold Standard carbon offsets worth ten times the show's estimated emissions. "We knew from the get go that we would get some criticism for what is clearly somewhat frivolous travel", Denby stated.

The players travel without any production crew. Instead the video is recorded by the players themselves, using just handheld or tripod-mounted phones and wearable microphones, an approach that Denby says allows the competitors to focus on content rather than production.

== Seasons ==
As of October 2026, Jet Lag: The Game has released 19 complete seasons, plus a two-episode special.

Seasons of Jet Lag: The Game
Season	Title	Episodes	Originally released		Location	Guest(s)	Winner(s)	Game
Season	Title	Episodes	First released	Last released	Location	Guest(s)	Winner(s)	Game
1	Connect 4	3	May 25, 2022	June 1, 2022	United States (Note: Only contiguous states west of the Mississippi River were part of the game board. Although not claimable as part of the game, Chicago served as its starting point.)	Brian McManus	Sam Denby & Brian McManus	Connect Four via claiming western US states
2	Circumnavigation	5	June 29, 2022	July 28, 2022	Worldwide	Joseph Pisenti	Adam Chase & Ben Doyle	Race to circumnavigate the world
3	Tag Eur It	7	September 7, 2022	October 19, 2022	Western Europe	—	Adam Chase	Tag across Western Europe
4	Battle 4 America	5	December 7, 2022	January 4, 2023	United States	Brian McManus	Adam Chase & Ben Doyle	Claim the most US states (Note: Washington, D.C. is included as a claimable area)
5	Race to the End of the World	8	March 1, 2023	April 19, 2023	New Zealand	Toby Hendy	Sam Denby & Toby Hendy	Drive the length of New Zealand, unlocking paths via challenges
6	Capture the Flag	7	May 31, 2023	July 12, 2023	Japan	Scotty Allen	Adam Chase & Ben Doyle	Capture the flag across Japan, starting in Tokyo
7	Tag Eur It 2	6	September 6, 2023	October 11, 2023	Western Europe	—	Ben Doyle	Tag across Western Europe
8	Arctic Escape	6	December 13, 2023	January 17, 2024	United States	Michelle Khare	Sam Denby & Michelle Khare	A race from Utqiagvik, Alaska to Key West, Florida
9	Hide + Seek	5	February 28, 2024	March 27, 2024	Switzerland	—	Adam Chase	Hide-and-seek across Switzerland
10	Au$tralia (Note: Stylized in all caps as AU$TRALIA)	6	May 15, 2024	June 19, 2024	Australia	Toby Hendy	Sam Denby & Toby Hendy	Claim the most regions of Australia
11	Tag Eur It 3	6	August 21, 2024	September 25, 2024	Southern Europe	—	Sam Denby	Tag across Southern Europe
12	Hide + Seek Japan	7	December 4, 2024	January 15, 2025	Japan	—	Ben Doyle	Hide-and-seek across Japan
13	Schengen Showdown	6	March 5, 2025	April 9, 2025	Schengen Area (Note: Including Andorra, Monaco, San Marino, and Vatican City. Additionally, London functioned as the start point of the game but the United Kingdom was not included as a claimable country.)	Tom Scott	Adam Chase & Ben Doyle	Claim the most countries in the Schengen Area
13.5	Hide + Seek NYC	2	April 23, 2025	April 30, 2025	New York City	Amy Muller	Sam Denby & Ben Doyle	Hide-and-seek across New York City
14	Snake (Note: Stylized on YouTube as SnaKe)	6	June 11, 2025	July 16, 2025	South Korea	—	Adam Chase	Snake across the South Korean railway network
15	Tag Eur It: All Stars	6	September 17, 2025	October 22, 2025	Western Europe	Toby Hendy, Michelle Khare, Brian McManus	Adam Chase & Michelle Khare	Tag across Western Europe
16	Hide + Seek UK	7	December 17, 2025	January 28, 2026	United Kingdom	—	Adam Chase	Hide-and-seek across the United Kingdom
17	Taiwan: Rail Rush	8	March 18, 2026	May 6, 2026	Taiwan	Michael Downie	Adam Chase & Ben Doyle	Claim the most long-distance train stations in Taiwan
18	Stateside Scramble	6	June 10, 2026	July 15, 2026	United States & Canada	Amy Muller	Adam Chase & Ben Doyle	Claim the most US states forming a single contiguous area (Note: Washington, D.C. and Canada are also included as claimable areas)
19	Japanorama	8	August 19, 2026	October 7, 2026	Japan	Tom Scott	Sam Denby & Ben Doyle	A race from the southernmost to the northernmost railway station in Japan
20	Hide + Seek Italy (Note: Also referred to as Hide + Seek Expert Mode)	TBA	TBA	TBA	Italy	—	TBA	Hide-and-seek across Italy

=== Season 1: Connect 4 ===
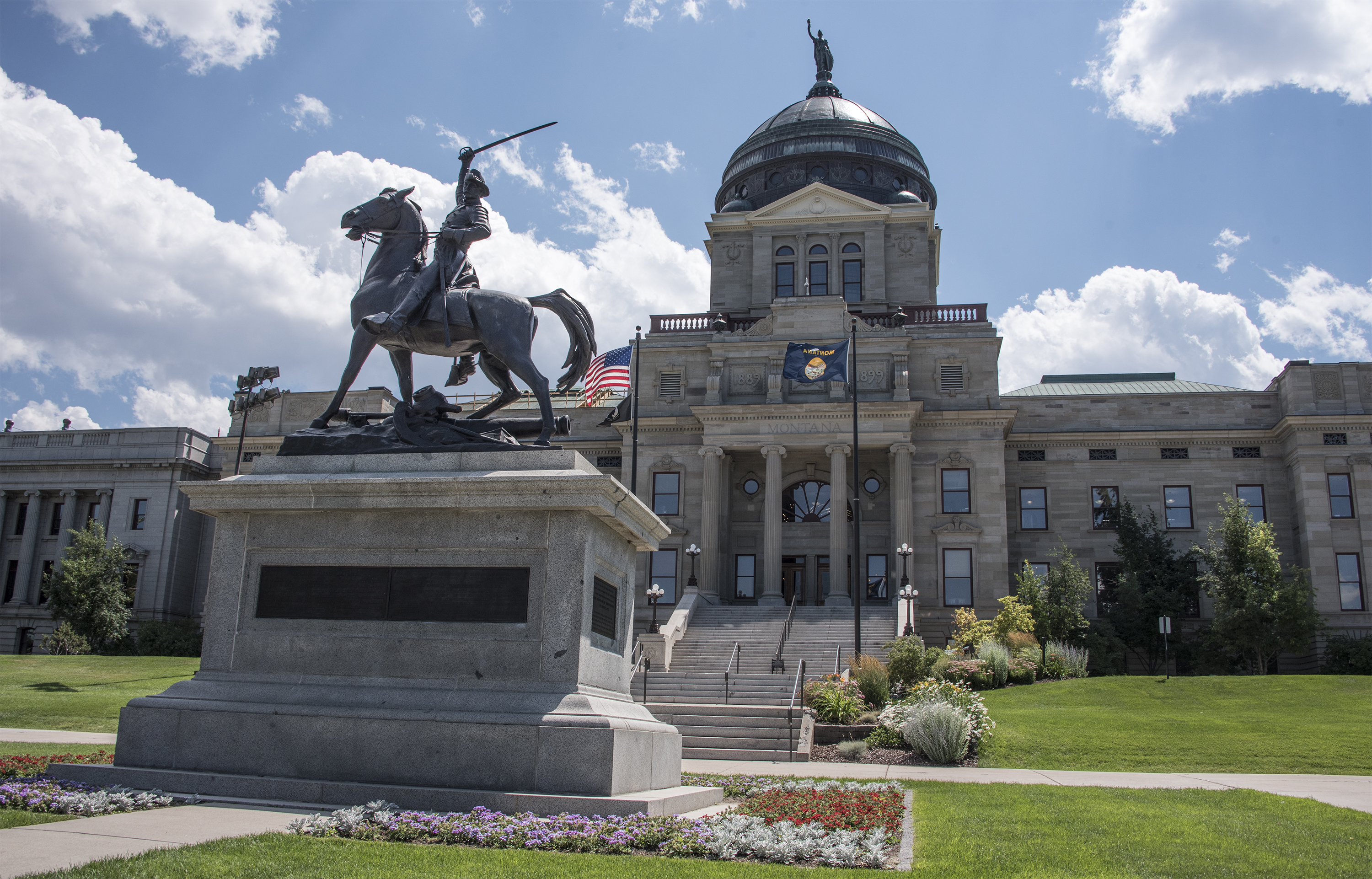
Season 1 concluded in front of the Montana State Capitol in Helena.

The first season premiered on May 25, 2022. Starting in Chicago, Denby and guest Brian McManus competed against Chase and Doyle. The game area consists of the 22 contiguous states of the United States west of the Mississippi River, in a game of geographical Connect 4, with the goal of claiming 4 states in a row on a direct east–west or north–south line. Teams must travel to their target state's capitol building, draw a challenge card at random, then successfully complete it to claim that state.

By the end of the game, Chase and Doyle had claimed Colorado, Oregon, Arizona, Utah, and Wyoming, whereas Denby and McManus had claimed California, Nevada, and Idaho. Both teams converged at Salt Lake City, Utah, with Chase and Doyle claiming the state, and boarded the same flight to Butte, Montana. From there, the teams traveled to Helena, Montana, with Denby and McManus arriving first. They then drew a card that allowed them to claim the state immediately, thereby connecting four states and winning the game.

=== Season 2: Circumnavigation ===
The second season premiered on June 29, 2022. Starting and ending in Denver, Denby and Joseph Pisenti, host of the YouTube channel RealLifeLore, compete against Chase and Doyle to be the first to circumnavigate the world. To count as a circumnavigation, each team must travel at least 22,859 mi (36,788 km) and cross all meridians. Teams start with a US$1,000 travel budget and can earn more by completing challenges selected from a deck of cards. Once a team completes a challenge, the same challenge cannot be completed by the opposing team. To encourage onward travel, the second challenge completed within a 300 mi (480 km) radius is worth half the stated value, and any subsequent challenge is worth one quarter of its stated value.

During the game, both teams reached Singapore on the same day with different routes; Denby and Pisenti arrived via Cancún and Amsterdam, while Chase and Doyle arrived via New York City and Milan. Here, both teams aimed to complete some of the same challenges, with Chase and Doyle succeeding in more of them before Denby and Pisenti were able to do so. Denby and Pisenti were stranded in Singapore after gambling away their budget as a last-ditch plan, while Chase and Doyle were able to finish the journey back to Denver via Sydney, Nadi, and Los Angeles to win the game.

=== Season 3: Tag Eur It ===
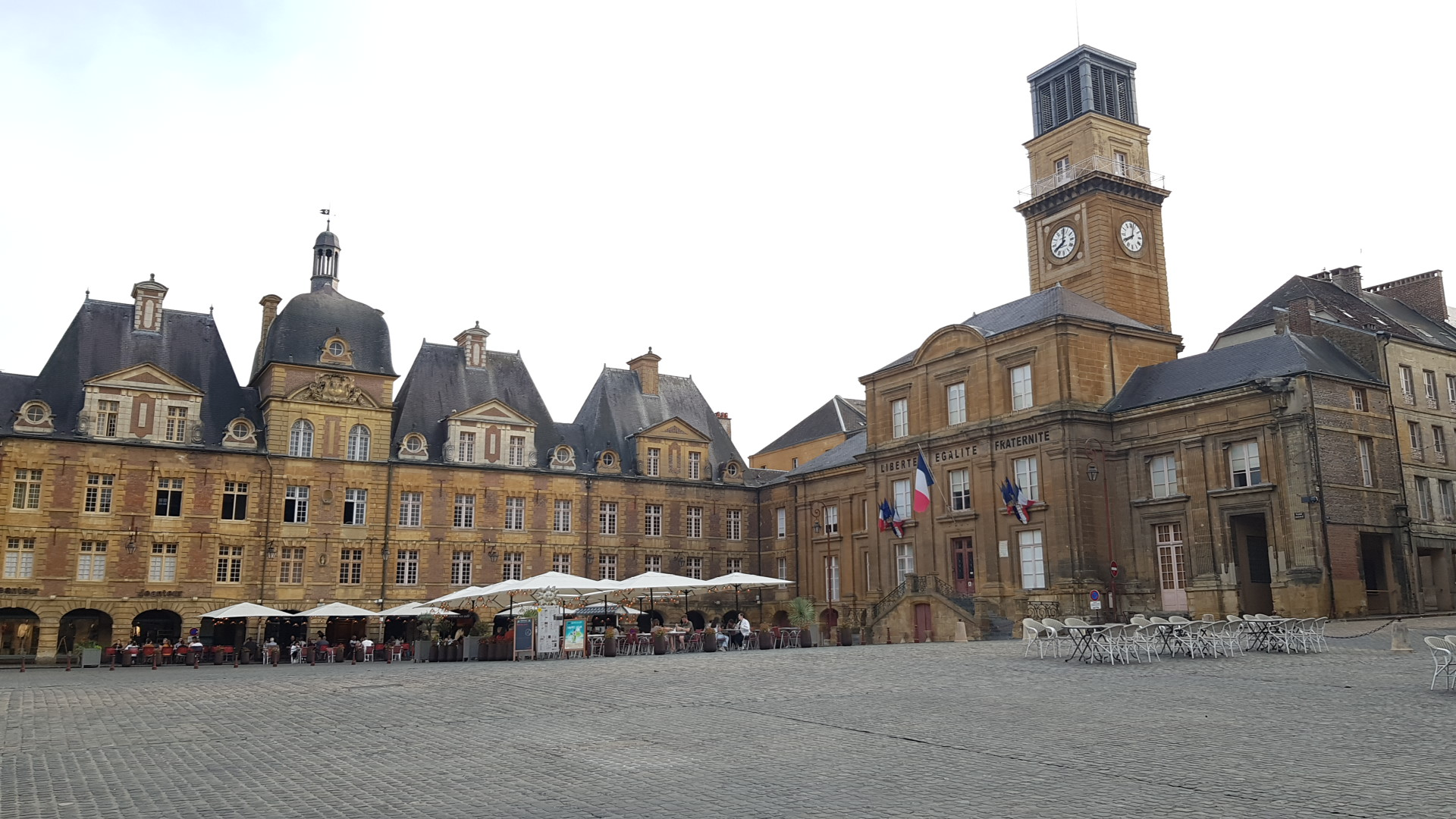
Seasons 3, 7, and 15 began at the Place Ducale in Charleville-Mézières.

The third season premiered on September 7, 2022. Starting in Charleville-Mézières, Denby, Chase, and Doyle play tag. Taking turns as the runner, each player aims to reach their respective destination: Zermatt for Denby, Jersey for Chase, and Borkum for Doyle. After 45 minutes, the other two pursue the runner using their GPS location. The runner completes challenges to earn coins for transportation and can purchase power-ups or veto challenges at the cost of a 30-minute penalty. A player wins upon reaching their destination; otherwise, the player whose destination is closest to the final runner wins.

Doyle was quickly caught in Lille while trying to board a train to Kortrijk. Denby then deliberately stranded himself in Calais to build his budget before being caught. Chase ran toward Paris but was caught at Massy-Palaiseau. Doyle became the runner again, chaining small towns toward Brussels before being caught. Denby then traveled south through Germany toward Stuttgart but was caught on the train. Chase subsequently reached the Champagne-Ardenne TGV station, 3 mi (4.8 km) inside his win area, and hid in the surrounding countryside. Denby and Doyle eventually tagged him, but Doyle could not escape the win area in time, making Chase the winner.

=== Season 4: Battle 4 America ===
The fourth season premiered on December 7, 2022. Starting in New York City, Denby and Brian McManus compete against Chase and Doyle to claim the most US states and the District of Columbia over four days. Teams have a US$3,000 travel budget, plus US$1,000 each day. They draw seven challenges and claim states by completing a challenge there, with new challenges replacing completed ones. Some challenges award tokens that can purchase power-ups. Teams can also steal states through battle challenges after claiming two bordering states. Each state is worth one point, with a two-point bonus for the team holding the most land area.

Denby and McManus fell behind early and focused on the area bonus, claiming Texas and California. After competing for Arizona, they challenged Chase and Doyle for Nevada, but lost the battle, decided by a popular vote on Twitter. Chase and Doyle then flew to Ketchikan to claim Alaska, securing the area bonus. Denby and McManus conceded shortly afterward, losing 9–14.

=== Season 5: Race to the End of the World ===
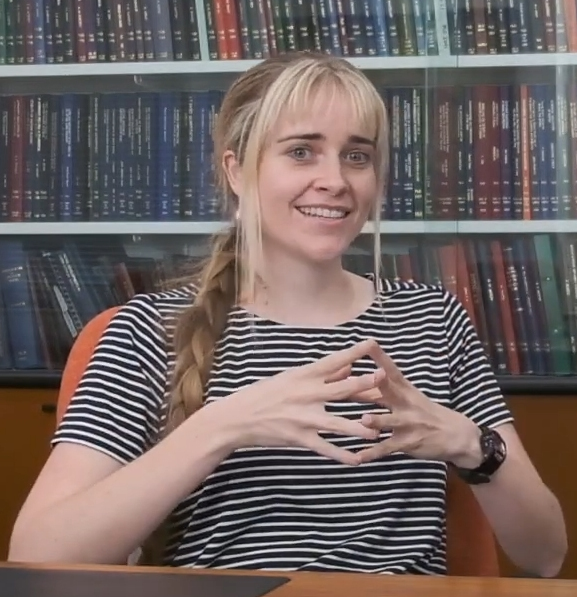
Toby Hendy was a guest competitor for seasons 5, 10, and 15.

The fifth season premiered on March 1, 2023. Starting in Cape Reinga, the northernmost point of New Zealand, Denby and Toby Hendy compete against Chase and Doyle in a road trip to Lookout Point in Bluff. Teams follow predetermined routes across the country, encountering local challenges along the state highway network. Completing or vetoing roadblocks allows teams to advance, while successful challenges awards coins for power-ups, including skipping or placing roadblocks, curses, and Nerf gun darts. A player hit by a dart incurs a 30-minute penalty for the entire team.

The teams remained closely matched early on, reaching Auckland simultaneously and competing to complete its challenge first. Denby and Hendy won and built a lead before taking the first ferry across the Cook Strait to Picton. Although ferry delays reduced their advantage and Chase and Doyle later used a curse to force them onto a slower route, Denby and Hendy maintained their lead and reached Lookout Point first, winning the game.

=== Season 6: Capture the Flag ===
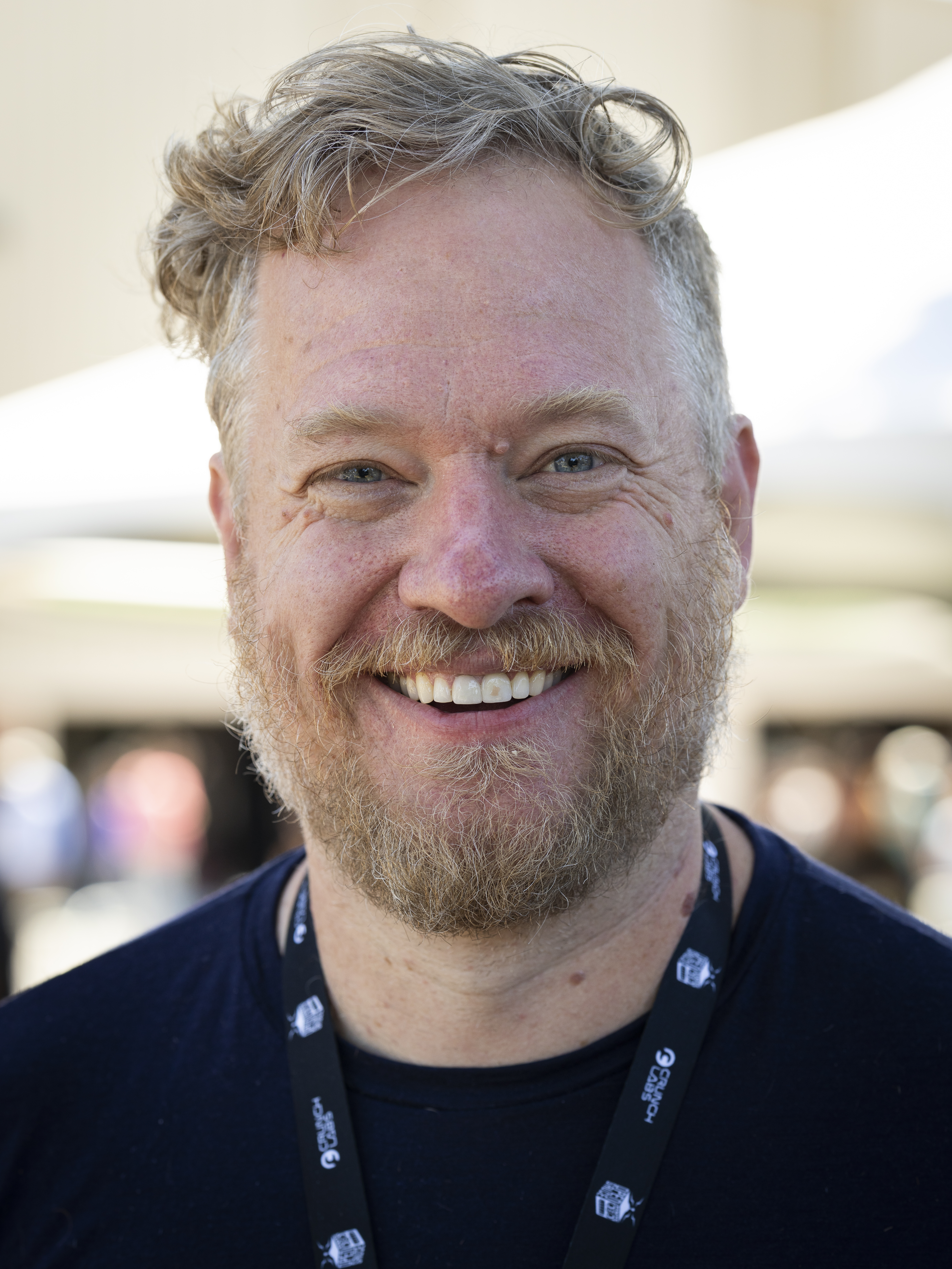
Scotty Allen from Strange Parts was a guest competitor for season 6.

The sixth season premiered on May 31, 2023. Starting at Tokyo Station, Denby and Scotty Allen, host of the YouTube channel Strange Parts, compete against Chase and Doyle in a game of capture the flag across Japan. The flag locations are vending machines and the flag is represented by an item purchased from that vending machine. Team members complete randomly drawn challenges, earning coins to purchase transportation in their opponent's territory. If a team member is caught, they forfeit all their coins to their opponent and serve a 30-minute penalty at Tokyo Station before resuming the game. Teams can also place "towers" which impose restrictions on players' movement within their area of effect. If both teams capture and return the same number of flags in a round, the tie is broken by which team has transported their flags over a longer total distance.

The game was divided into three rounds, worth 1, 2, and 3 points respectively, with both teams respectively having 1, 2, and 3 flags each in their territory. Each round covered a progressively larger area of Japan. Chase and Doyle won the first two rounds by capturing all of their opponents' flags. In the third round, both teams captured one flag each, but Denby and Allen transported their second flag over a longer distance, thus winning that round. In the tie-breaker round, the players were not allowed to place towers, competing in a best-of-seven format to collect flags in Tokyo itself. Chase and Doyle collected four flags, and Denby and Allen collected only one, giving Chase and Doyle the victory.

=== Season 7: Tag Eur It 2 ===
The seventh season premiered on September 6, 2023. Starting in Charleville-Mézières again, Denby, Chase, and Doyle repeated the game format from season 3, but with the player destinations rotated: Denby aiming for Jersey, Chase for Borkum, and Doyle for Zermatt.

Doyle went first, but was tagged early on at Meuse TGV. Chase, who was next, was able to eventually reach Emden, the final stop en route to Borkum, before getting tagged while waiting for a ferry. Denby was next, but would be tagged after train cancellations had left him stranded in 's-Hertogenbosch station. Doyle became the runner again, heading south towards Luxembourg. After narrowly avoiding the chasers in Howald, Doyle arrived in Metz. Initially intending to go to Nancy, Doyle hid in a photo booth to evade Denby and Chase, before managing to surreptitiously board an infrequent train to Bar-le-Duc. When the chasers caught up with Doyle there, they declared him the winner of the season, as there was no way for Chase as the next runner to get to his win area before the end of the game.

=== Season 8: Arctic Escape ===
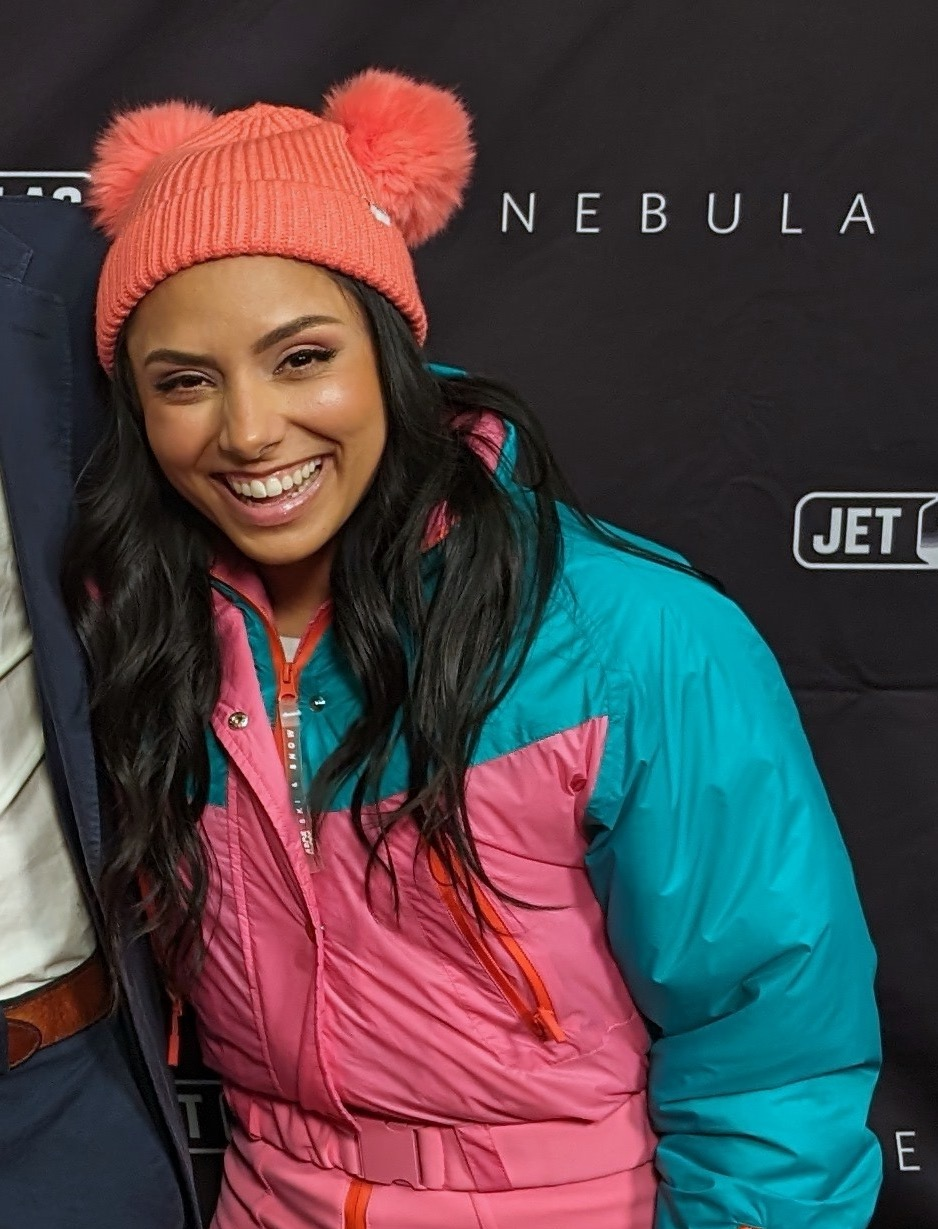
Michelle Khare was a guest competitor for seasons 8 and 15.

The eighth season premiered on December 13, 2023. Starting in Utqiagvik, Alaska, Denby and Michelle Khare compete against Chase and Doyle to be the first to reach the southernmost point of the continental United States in Key West, Florida. Teams complete challenges from a common pool called the flop to earn transportation tickets for planes, trains, or rental cars, with restrictions on distance and destination. Some challenges allow teams to steal tickets from their opponents. Four challenges are available at a time, with completed challenges replaced and the entire flop reset daily.

Denby and Khare won the first challenge by popular vote on Twitter, becoming the first to leave Alaska. Chase and Doyle later won a ticket from Seattle to Denver, forcing Denby and Khare to drive across the Rocky Mountains to Montrose, then fly to Dallas and Birmingham before driving to Atlanta. Chase and Doyle flew to Milwaukee and took a sleeper train from Chicago to Connellsville. Denby and Khare twice stole tickets from Chase and Doyle, ultimately allowing them to reach Key West while their opponents were still at the Atlanta Airport.

=== Season 9: Hide + Seek ===
The ninth season premiered on February 28, 2024. Starting in Lucerne, Denby, Chase, and Doyle compete in a four-day game of hide-and-seek across Switzerland. Players can only travel on foot or by train. The hider has 2.5 hours to reach a location within 0.5 mi (0.805 km) of a train station, after which the seekers can pursue them. Seekers can ask pre-set questions to gain clues, earning the hider coins to purchase curses. The hider can roam locally until the seekers reach the same locality, after which they have to remain in one hiding place. The player with the longest hiding time wins.

Chase first hid in Hospental atop its castle, lasting 4 hours and 39 minutes. Doyle then hid in Merlischachen, misleading the seekers toward Zug before being found after 9 hours and 36 minutes. Denby hid in Winterthur, where the seekers spent over five hours searching a woodland on the city's outskirts, giving him 7 hours and 23 minutes. Finally, Chase traveled to Thun before running to nearby Steffisburg, which the seekers overlooked because it lacked train access within the time limit. They failed to find him before the game ended, giving Chase the win after he surpassed Doyle's record.

=== Season 10: Au$tralia ===
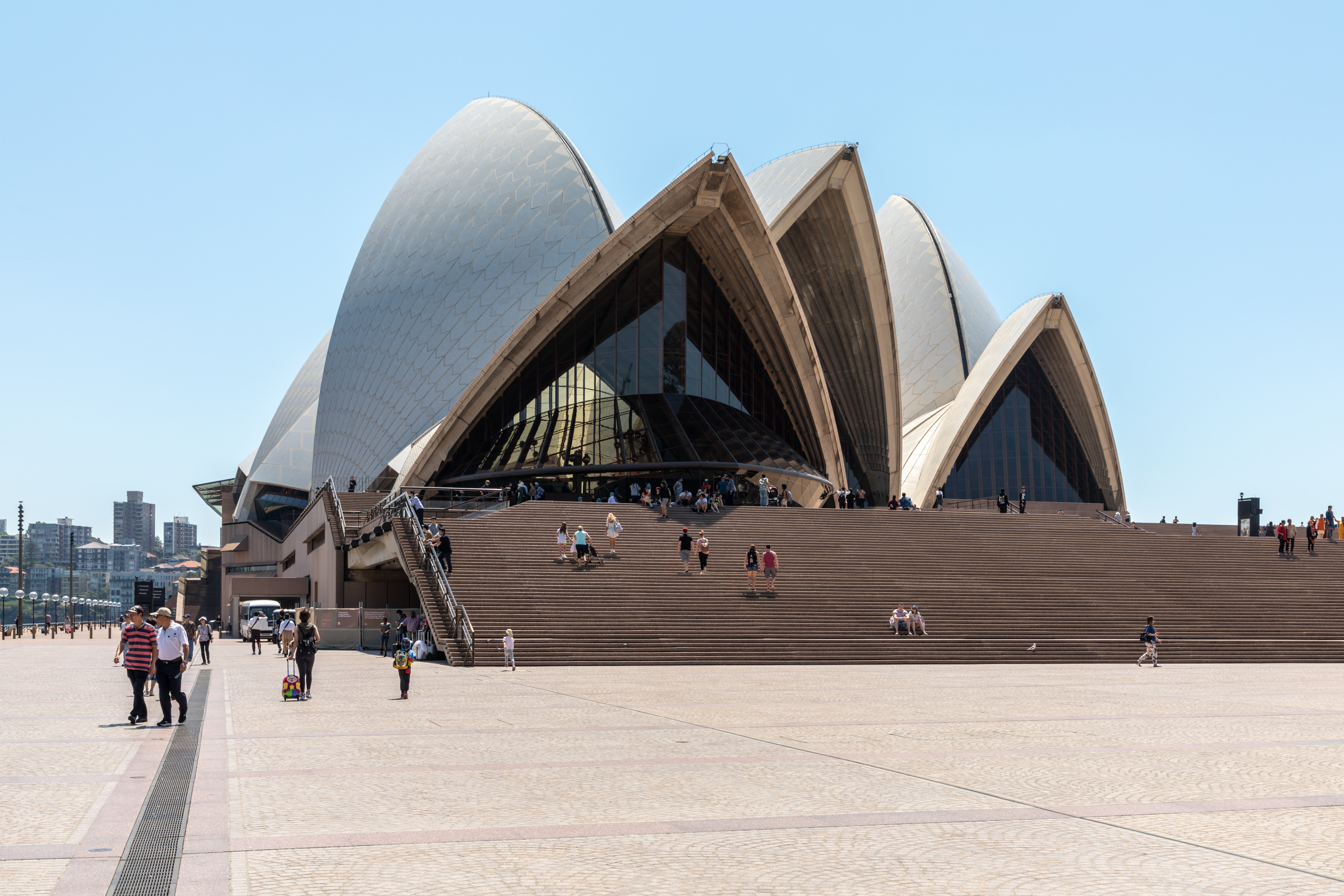
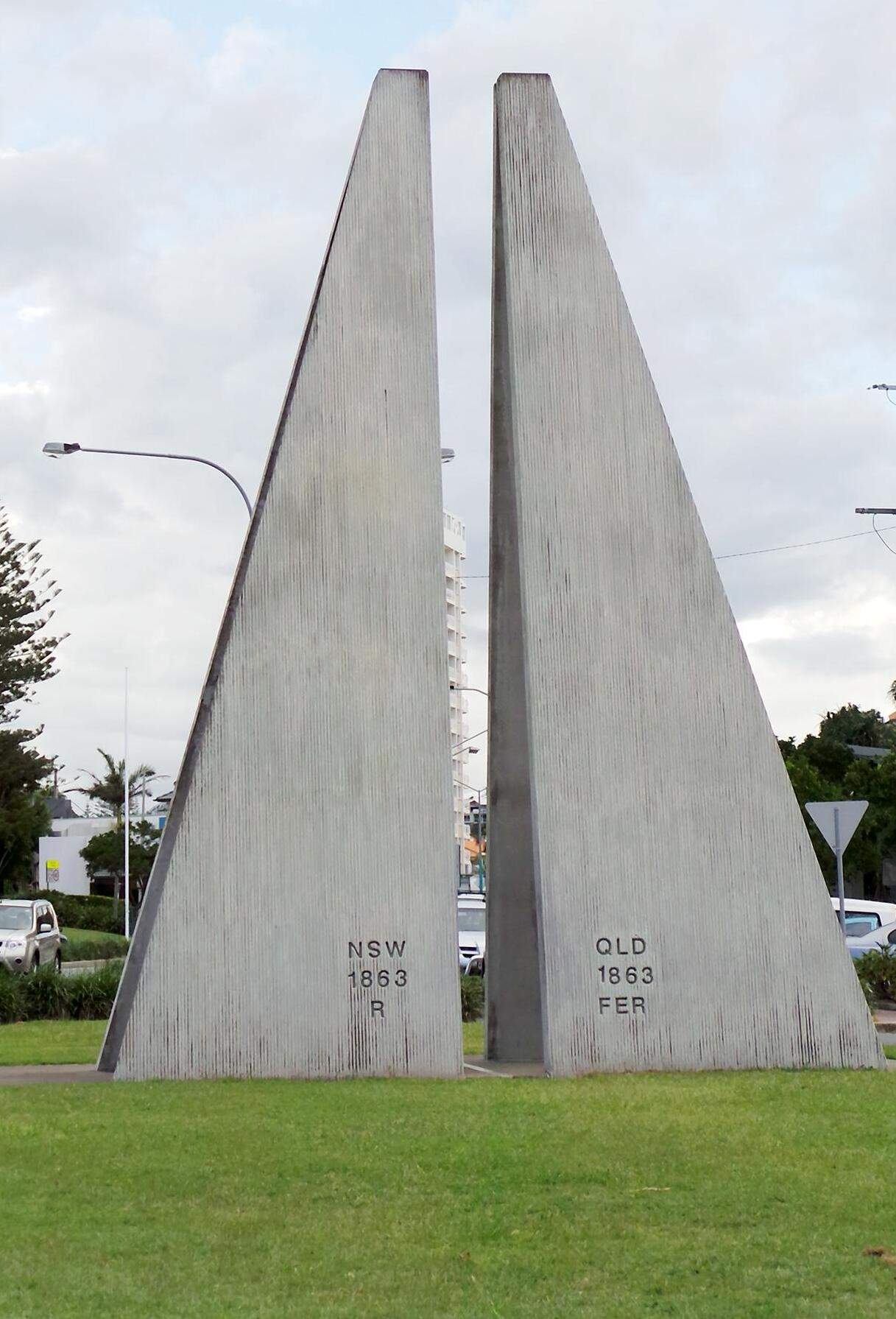
Season 10 began at the Sydney Opera House (left) and ended when Denby and Hendy claimed Queensland and New South Wales at their Gold Coast border (right).

Toby Hendy returned as the guest competitor for season 10, which premiered on May 15, 2024. The goal is to claim the most of Australia's eight regions. Teams deposit money into regions, with the highest total claiming each one. Money can be earned through challenges or by stealing from the opposing team, both requiring wagers. Teams start with A$1,000, receive A$250 each day, and earn A$750 for being first to a region. The team with the most regions after four days wins.

Teams began in Sydney. Denby and Hendy claimed New South Wales, Queensland, and the Australian Capital Territory, while Chase and Doyle claimed Tasmania, South Australia, Victoria, and the Northern Territory. The teams then traded South Australia, Victoria, and Queensland. On the final day, Chase and Doyle planned to claim the Australian Capital Territory and New South Wales, but with direct flights to Canberra booked out, they flew to Sydney and reclaimed New South Wales. Believing Denby and Hendy were heading to Tasmania, they flew to Melbourne. Denby and Hendy instead reached the Gold Coast Airport on the New South Wales–Queensland border and claimed both states in quick succession, winning 4–3.

=== Season 11: Tag Eur It 3 ===
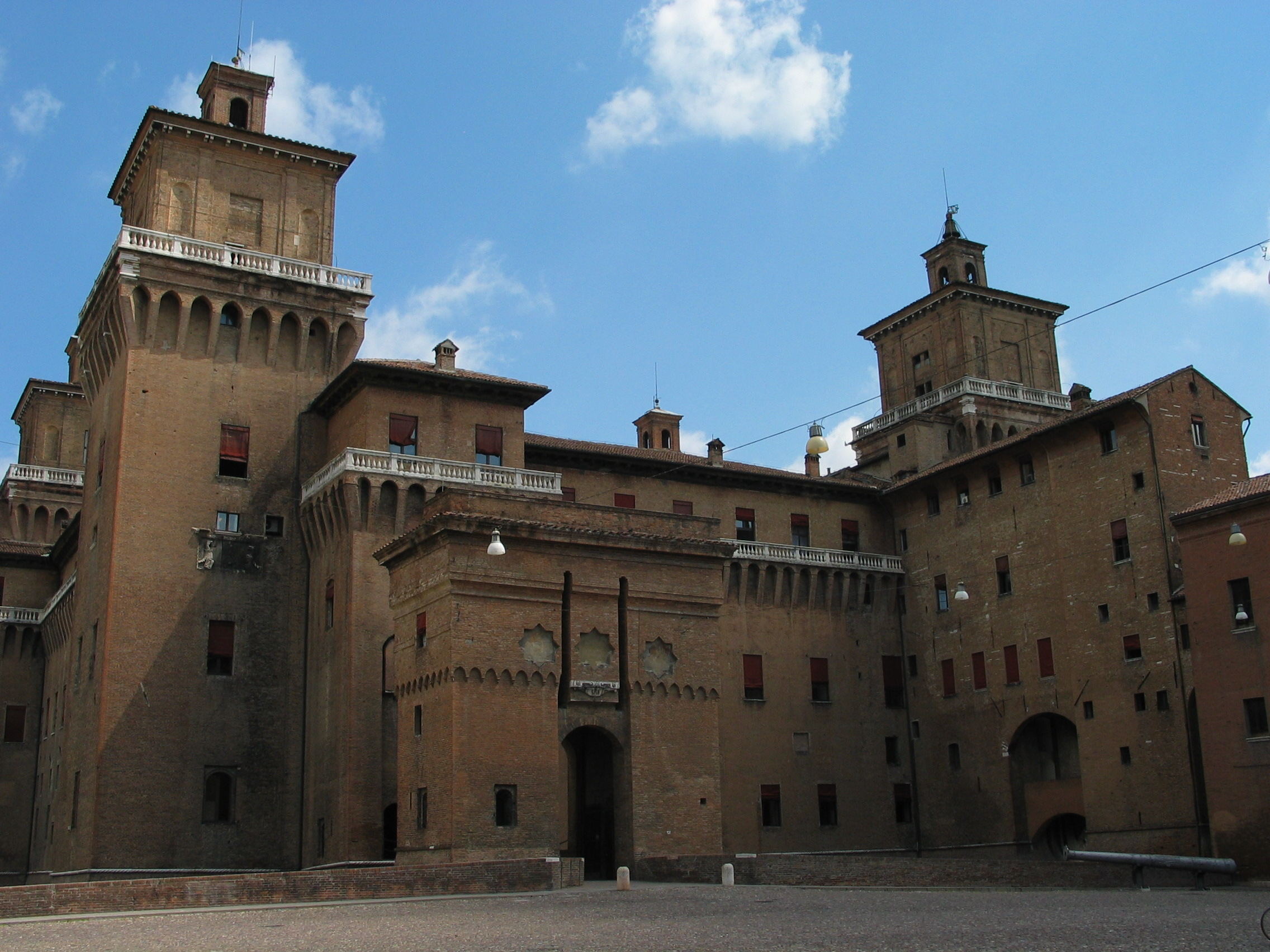
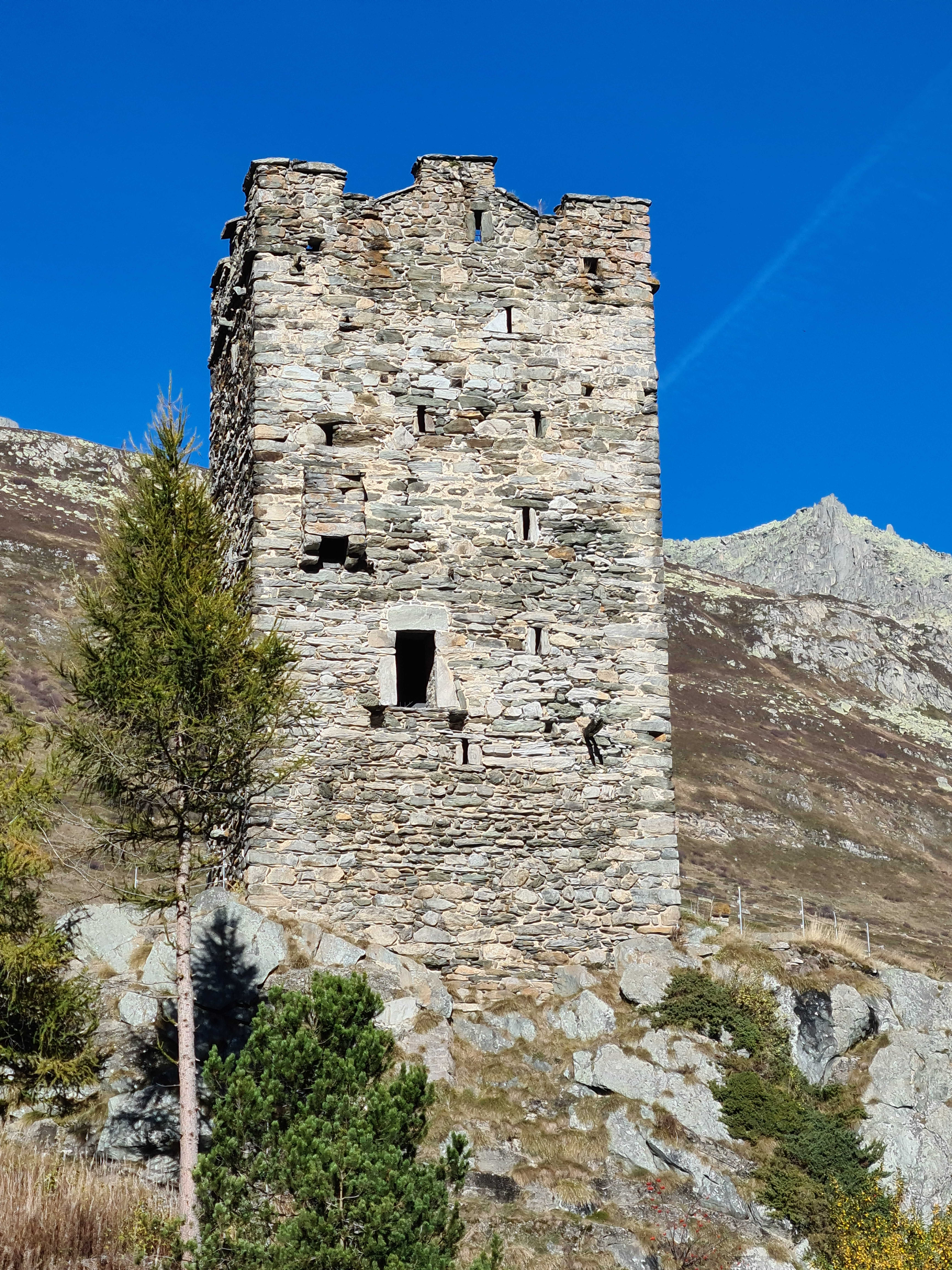
Season 11 began outside the Castello Estense in Ferrara (left) and ended atop Hospental Castle in Hospental (right).

The eleventh season premiered on August 21, 2024. Denby, Chase, and Doyle repeated the game format from seasons 3 and 7, but with a new starting point in Ferrara, Italy, and new final destinations: Denby aiming for Lyon, France; Chase for Bratislava, Slovakia; and Doyle for Capri, Italy.

Chase was randomly selected to run first. He made it to Nova Gorica, a Slovenian town on the border with Italy, before the chasers caught up with him and tagged him at Nova Gorica station. Denby was next in the rotation. After getting to Bassano del Grappa, Denby failed to solve a puzzle box challenge and incurred a time penalty and subsequently chose to attempt to amass as many coins as possible, eventually being tagged in Trento. Doyle's run was largely unsuccessful, narrowly missing a train out of Trento to Verona and only making it back to the starting point of Ferrara. On his second run, Chase managed to evade the chasers twice while being at the same train station as them before he was tagged in Castelfranco Veneto. Using the high coin balance from his first run, fortuitous train schedules, and a well-timed challenge called "Eat This Card", Denby was able to build a multi-hour gap from the chasers as he efficiently made his way to Switzerland, far into his win region. He chose to travel to Hospental Castle, the location he and Doyle had found Chase hiding in season 9. He was tagged there with less than one hour left in the game and declared the winner.

=== Season 12: Hide + Seek Japan ===
The twelfth season premiered on December 4, 2024. In this season Denby, Chase, and Doyle played a modified version of the game format from season 9, competing in Japan. It lasted six days and included a new selection of seeker questions as well as the addition of a deck of cards for the hider that provide curses and other tools, such as bonuses adding various amounts to the actual time they remained hidden.

Starting from Tokyo Station, Doyle first hid in Yamadera, scoring 9 hours and 59 minutes. Chase then hid near Tobiyama Castle Site Station and scored 7 hours and 41 minutes, while Denby hid at Higashi-Narita Station but was found when the seekers accidentally took a train to his exact location, scoring 7 hours and 42 minutes. On his second run, Doyle hid near Izu-Kōgen Station and scored 13 hours and 9 minutes after the seekers incorrectly assumed he could not have traveled south of Itō. Chase then hid in Saruhashi, scoring 11 hours and 21 minutes. Denby then hid near Kawagoe Station, but used a card to change locations as the seekers approached, eventually being found near Naka-Urawa Station after 10 hours and 46 minutes. Doyle's second-run score made him the season's winner.

=== Season 13: Schengen Showdown ===
Tom Scott was the guest competitor for seasons 13 and 19.

The thirteenth season premiered on March 5, 2025. Starting in London, Denby and Tom Scott competed against Chase and Doyle to claim the most countries in the Schengen Area over six days. Countries are claimed by visiting them and can be locked by completing a secret country-specific challenge. Teams must use public transportation and have a US$4,000 flight budget.

Denby and Scott quickly claimed France and Belgium but failed the Netherlands challenge. Chase and Doyle claimed Switzerland and Germany, then stole France by completing its challenge. They also stole Austria after beating Denby and Scott on its challenge. Denby and Scott later locked Hungary, the Czech Republic, and Slovakia, while Chase and Doyle claimed Liechtenstein, Italy, and Vatican City. Denby and Scott then claimed Denmark and Sweden but failed both challenges, allowing Chase and Doyle to steal them. After Denby and Scott also failed Finland's challenge, they flew to Vilnius and claimed Lithuania. Chase and Doyle meanwhile locked Norway. With the score at 10–7 and a snowstorm preventing Denby and Scott from leaving Vilnius, they conceded at the end of the fifth day.

=== Season 13.5: Hide + Seek NYC ===
A special two-episode "season 13.5" was played in New York City demonstrating the show's Hide and Seek home game, premiering on April 23, 2025. Amy Muller, a writer and producer for the series, joined the three regulars. Unlike the guests in previous seasons, Muller allied with Chase rather than Denby. The game was played in two parts, separated by production of season 13.

Starting at Grand Central Terminal in Midtown Manhattan, Chase and Muller went first and hid near the Forest Hills–71st Avenue subway station in Queens, which Denby and Doyle found using the tile colours of the hiders' station. Chase and Muller achieved a total time of 4 hours and 2 seconds. Denby and Doyle went second and hid at the Elevated Acre near the Wall Street subway station in Lower Manhattan. While the seekers reached them quicker than in the first round, Denby and Doyle reached a time of 4 hours and 28 minutes after the addition of several time bonus cards, winning the special.

=== Season 14: Snake ===
Season 14 premiered on June 11, 2025. Starting at Yongsan Station, Denby, Chase, and Doyle competed in a five-day game based on the video game Snake, across South Korea. The designated "snaker" attempts to trace the longest possible path along the South Korean rail network without crossing itself, while the two "blockers" can place curses, roadblocks, and battle challenges. Runs are limited to 18 hours.

Doyle went first, tracing a route from Yongsan to Iksan, where he lost a battle challenge and scored 247.8 km (154.0 mi). Denby then traveled from Iksan to Donghae, Gangwon, but lost a battle challenge in Yeongdeok, finishing with 456.8 km (283.8 mi). Chase started from Seogyeongju and traced a route through Seoul to Busan, clearing every obstacle before returning toward Dongdaegu Station, where he crashed with a score of 867.3 km (538.9 mi). Doyle was randomly selected to go again and finished with 498.2 km (309.6 mi) after losing a battle challenge at Yongsan. With Chase having the longest line and insufficient time remaining for Denby's second run, Chase was declared the winner.

=== Season 15: Tag Eur It: All Stars ===
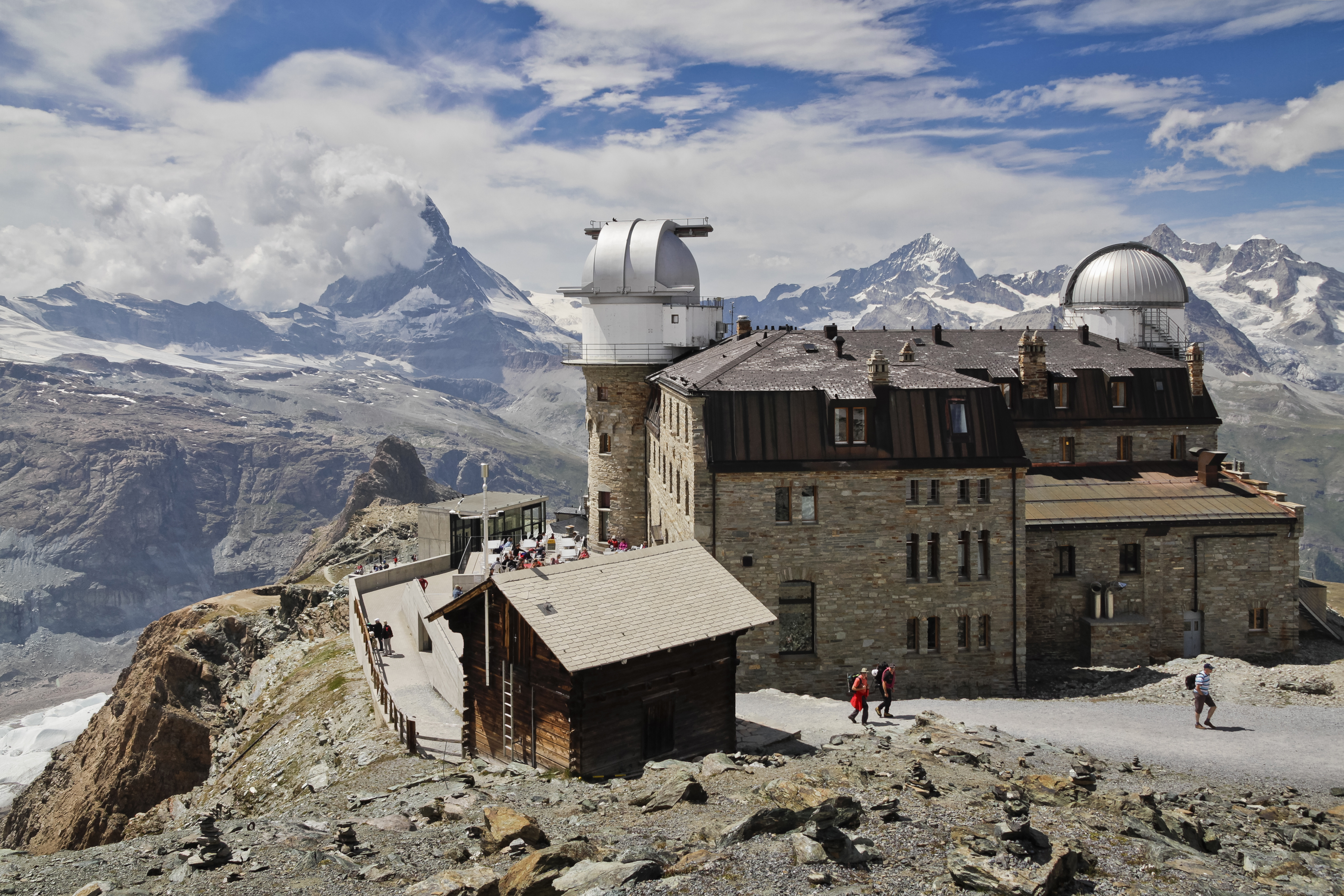
Adam Chase and Michelle Khare won season 15 by reaching their destination at the Gornergrat Observatory in Zermatt.

Season 15 premiered on September 17, 2025. Once again starting in Charleville-Mézières, the season features Denby, Chase, and Doyle repeating the "Tag" format, each teaming with a previous guest winner: Toby Hendy with Denby, Michelle Khare with Chase, and Brian McManus with Doyle. The pairs aimed for Jersey, Zermatt, and Borkum, respectively. Unlike prior seasons, chaser pairs can move independently; the pair that tags the runners first becomes the next runners.

Denby and Hendy went first, traveling to Laon before a curse forced them to backtrack to Prunay, where Chase and Khare tagged them. Chase and Khare then traveled to Strasbourg, building a large coin budget, while Doyle and McManus flew from Charles de Gaulle Airport to Zurich and closed in. Chase and Khare traveled nonstop to the Gornergrat Observatory in Zermatt, winning the season.

With a day and a half remaining, the two other teams competed for second place, with Chase and Khare drafted into the teams. Doyle, McManus, and Chase became the next runners, while Denby, Hendy, and Khare chased them. After train delays caused the chasers to miss the runners twice, Doyle, McManus, and Chase ended their run in Mengeringhausen, Germany, while the chasers remained in Kassel. Unable to reach their win region in time, Denby, Hendy, and Khare conceded, making Doyle and McManus the runners-up.

=== Season 16: Hide + Seek UK ===
Season 16 premiered on December 17, 2025. Taking place in the United Kingdom, it is a six-day game of hide-and-seek, similar to the format of seasons 9, 12, and 13.5. Similar to season 14, once all three players have played one round each as the hider, the next hider is chosen randomly from the two most recent seekers, with the player currently in the lead ineligible to be selected.

Starting from London, Chase went first. Hiding in the North Yorkshire town of Scarborough, he achieved a total score of 12 hours and 28 minutes. Doyle went second and hid in the town of Hebden Bridge in West Yorkshire. He achieved a total score of 7 hours and 17 minutes. Denby went third, hiding near Milton Keynes Central station, but gave away a nearby bank in a photograph, achieving a total score of 10 hours and 1 minute. With Chase still in the lead, Doyle became the next hider by default. He hid in the town of Kendal in Cumbria. The seekers used a weather radar map to pinpoint his station early on; he achieved a total score of 6 hours and 11 minutes. Denby then went again. He hid in the town of Dunbar in East Lothian, where he achieved a total score of 6 hours and 25 minutes. Doyle then went for a third time, hiding in the town of Dumfries in southern Scotland. Through careful use of cards he was able to delay the endgame but narrowly failed to beat Chase's time, finishing with a total score of 12 hours and 6 minutes. As Chase's score from the first run remained the highest, he was declared the winner of the season.

=== Season 17: Taiwan: Rail Rush ===
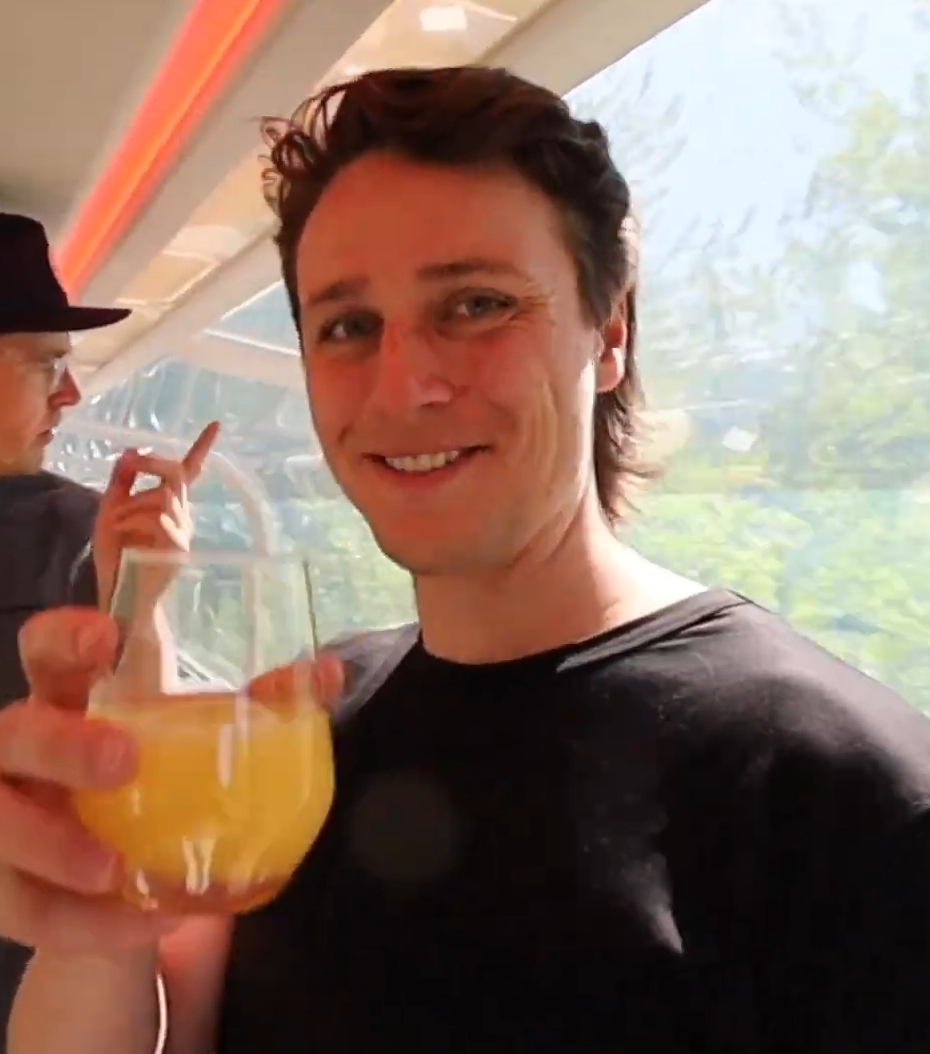
Michael Downie from DownieLive was the guest competitor for season 17.

Season 17 premiered on March 18, 2026, and took place in Taiwan. Michael Downie, host of DownieLive, was the guest competitor allied with Denby. Starting in Taipei, the goal is to claim the most stations on Taiwan's long-distance train network over five days. Teams claim stations by depositing chips, with the highest total winning the station. Teams need sufficient budget to claim a station and cannot control it by more than five chips. Challenges around the country provide additional chips.

Denby and Downie initially fortified stations around Taipei, Taoyuan, and Hsinchu, while Chase and Doyle secured stations along the Western Trunk line, taking an early lead. Chase and Doyle later expanded along the Eastern Trunk line but were forced to retreat after running out of budget. Denby and Downie then stole their eastern stations, but depleted their budget attempting a challenge near Beipu railway station and failed it, leaving them unable to recover. With the score 127–90, Denby and Downie conceded to Chase and Doyle.

=== Season 18: Stateside Scramble ===
Season 18 premiered on June 10, 2026. Starting in New York City, Denby and returning guest competitor Amy Muller compete against Chase and Doyle to claim the most contiguous US states. Teams claim states by completing state-specific challenges within them. A set of states are chosen at random to be available to either team. After being claimed, it and another state chosen by the claiming team are removed from the board and replaced. The deck also includes Canada and various "wild cards" that match multiple states. Both teams each also have a deck of five "private cards" and draw one of them at the start of each day. Teams start with a US$3,500 travel budget and receive an additional US$1,000 at the start of each day.

At the start of the game, Chase and Doyle focused on claiming Tennessee and several of its neighboring states, while Denby and Muller, after initially claiming Illinois, would focus on claiming Canada and states that border it in the Northeast and Midwest. Following a series of lucky card pulls, Chase and Doyle were able to claim several northeastern states as well while leaving Denby and Muller with few options to claim states that helped them. Ultimately, Chase and Doyle cemented their lead on the final day by claiming New Jersey with a wild card challenge at a Margaritaville restaurant in Atlantic City, and claiming South Carolina in Myrtle Beach, winning the season with a score of 11 to 8.

=== Season 19: Japanorama ===
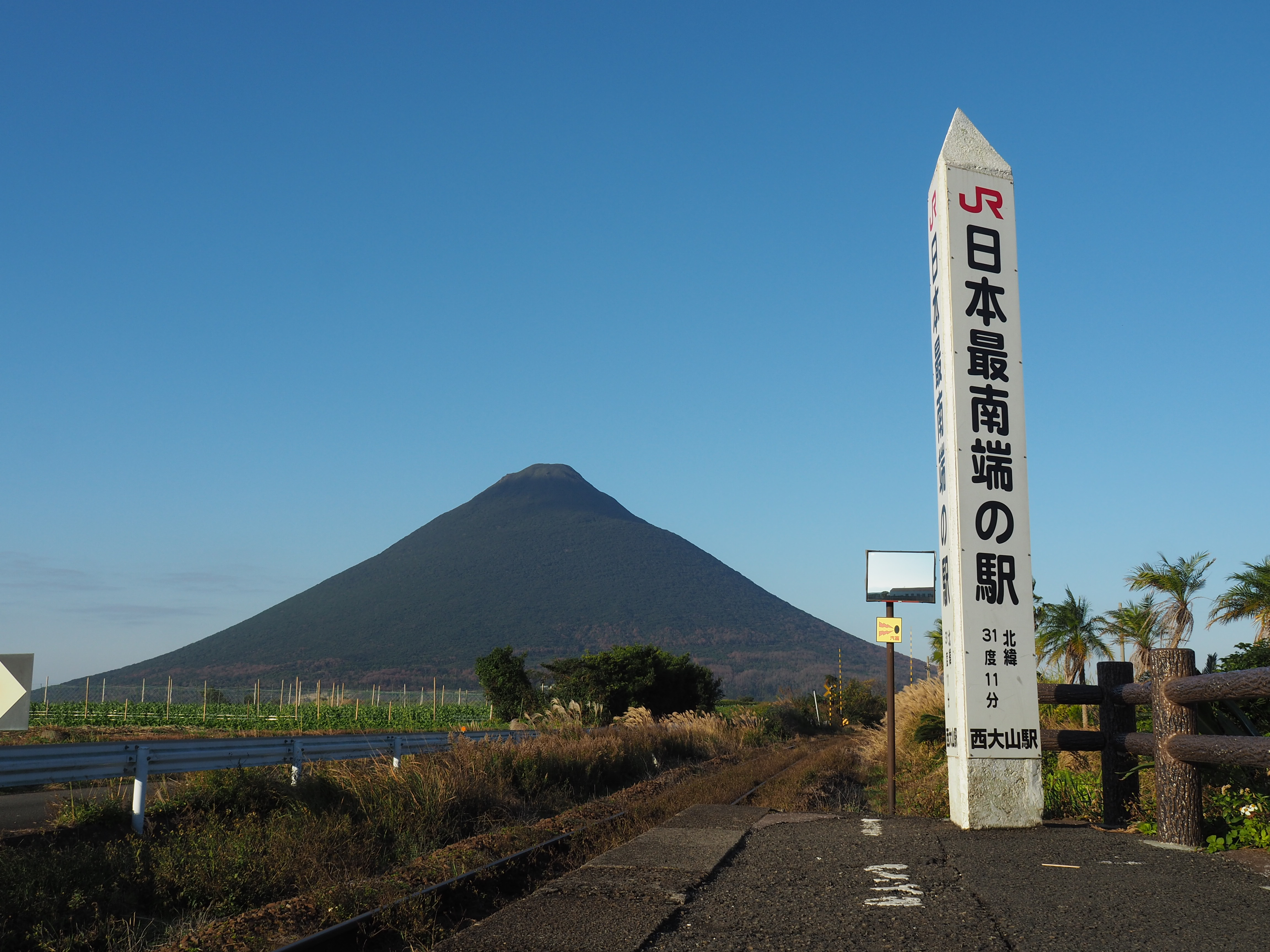
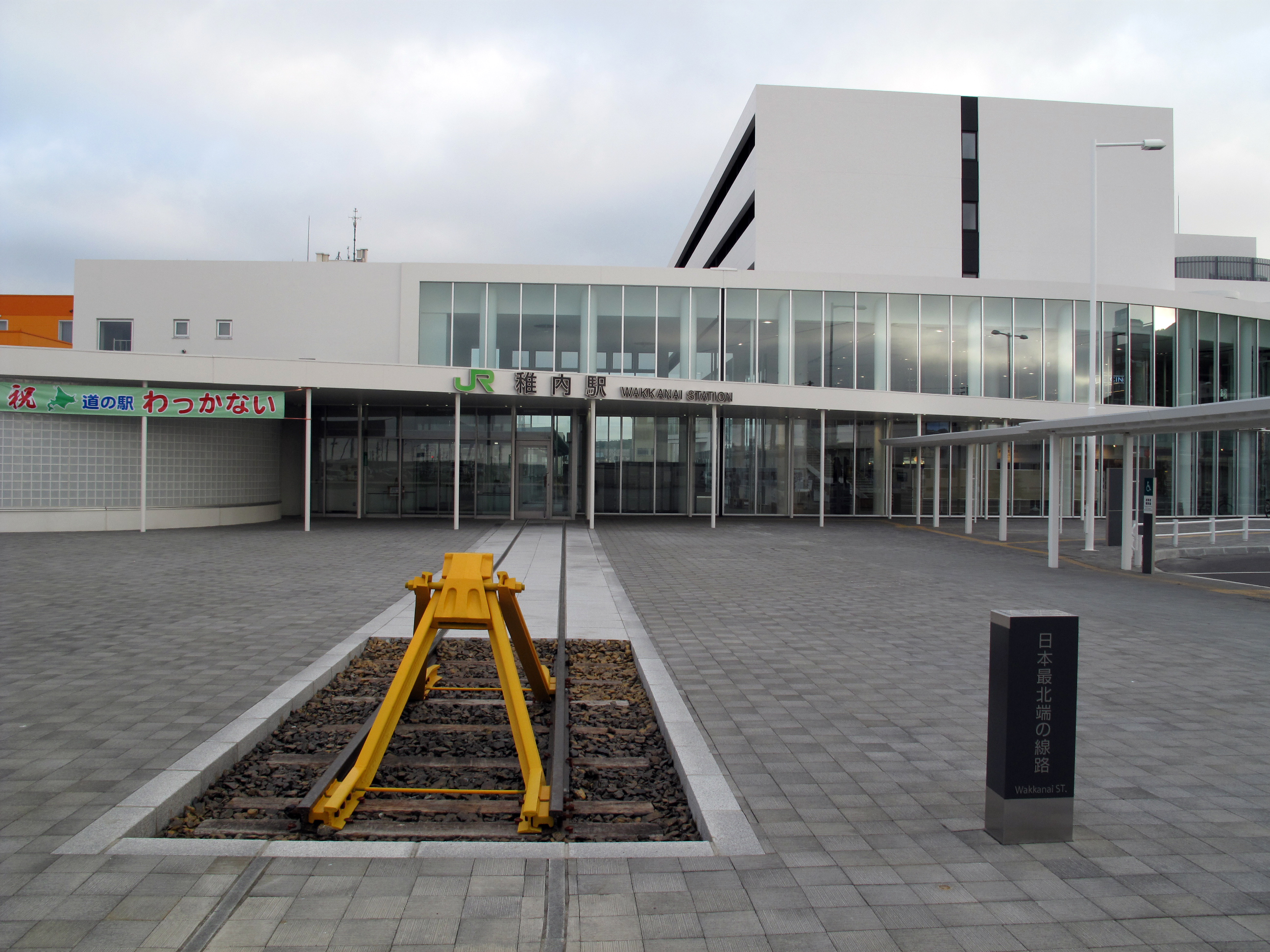
Season 19 was a race from Nishi-Ōyama Station (above) to Wakkanai Station (below).

The first episode of season 19 premiered on August 1, 2026, at a live event at Picturehouse Central London, with the episode also screened at a number of Picturehouse Cinemas across the United Kingdom. The episode was later released on Nebula on August 19, 2026. The final two episodes of the season also premiered as a single double-length episode in movie theaters on October 3, 2026, at a number of Picturehouse, Cineworld, Regal, and Landmark Cinemas across the UK, US, and Canada.

Chase and returning guest competitor Tom Scott compete against Denby and Doyle in a race from Nishi-Ōyama Station in Kagoshima Prefecture, the southernmost station of Japan Railways (JR), to Wakkanai Station in Hokkaido, the northernmost JR station. Teams must complete challenges from a shared bank to progress past the prefecture they are currently in. Completing a challenge is also rewarded by drawing a varying number of cards from a deck of power-ups that allow teams to move faster or sabotage their opponents, choosing one of the cards to keep.

Denby and Doyle were the first to leave the southern island of Kyushu, building up an early lead going through the Chūgoku region. However, Chase and Scott, taking a route through the island of Shikoku, were able to catch up and both teams were tied travelling through the Kansai region. After leaving Kyoto, Chase and Scott chose a western route along the Sea of Japan, going through fewer prefectures. Meanwhile, Denby and Doyle used their cards to take the Tokaido Shinkansen non-stop to Yokohama and to skip much of the Kantō region. Denby and Doyle were the first to reach Hokkaido with Scott and Chase following closely behind. After Scott and Chase completed a challenge while under a curse that gave both teams the reward, the teams drew a single additional card and met at Asahikawa Station. Denby and Doyle's final card draw allowed them to travel to Wakkanai Station first, making them the winners of the season.

=== Season 20: Hide + Seek Italy ===
The first episode of season 20 will premiere on December 5, 2026, at a number of Picturehouse, Cineworld, Regal, and Landmark Cinemas across the UK, US, and Canada. The season will be another game of hide-and-seek, this time taking place in Italy. The game's format has been modified to a new "expert mode", removing a number of seeker questions and adding penalties for seekers making mistakes.

== Additional content ==
The Jet Lag crew produces additional series-related content exclusively available to Nebula subscribers. Two companion videos titled The Layover were released after seasons 3 and 4; these transitioned into an audio podcast, which started concurrently with season 5 of the series. These serve primarily to discuss game design and production details from a behind-the-scenes perspective. Videos containing outtakes have been released on Nebula since season 8, as well as full challenge attempts and extended cuts of select moments from the show since season 16.

Following season 12, the company produced a set of materials for viewers to play the game themselves. Jet Lag: The Game Hide and Seek, including a deck of the game's cards, dice, rules, and a notepad, became available for purchase in November 2024. A metric version became available for purchase in April 2025, and an expansion pack became available for purchase in November 2025. Its rules are largely the same as those used in seasons 12 and 16 of the show, with some modifications allowing for play in different sizes of geographical area, ranging from small cities to international.

In September 2025, the three principal players and Matt Krol of Extra History produced a promotional video for Magic: The Gathering, playing a version of the collectible card game across New York City.

== Reception ==
In September 2023, the show surpassed one million hours streamed on Nebula. As of February 2026, the channel has reached over 1 million subscribers and over 133 million views on YouTube, with many individual episodes exceeding a million views.

Bradley Brownell of the website Kotaku called Jet Lag "one of his favorite shows on the internet." On July 28, 2025, Jet Lag was the subject of an episode of the public radio program The World. Jet Lag was also mentioned on the February 2, 2024, episode of the NPR podcast Pop Culture Happy Hour, as the show that made host Stephen Thompson happy that week.

=== Awards ===
Year	Award	Category	Result	Ref.
2023	13th Streamy Awards	Editing	Nominated	
2025	Webby Awards	People's Voice – Reality Unscripted, Video & Film	Won	
