= Adam Chase =

Adam Chase may refer to:

- Stephen Marlowe, American author who used Adam Chase as a pseudonym
- Adam Chase (writer), American TV writer and producer
- Adam Chase, co-creator of Jet Lag: The Game
