= Nishi-Ōyama Station =

Railway station in Ibusuki, Kagoshima Prefecture, Japan

Nishi-Ōyama Station 西大山駅
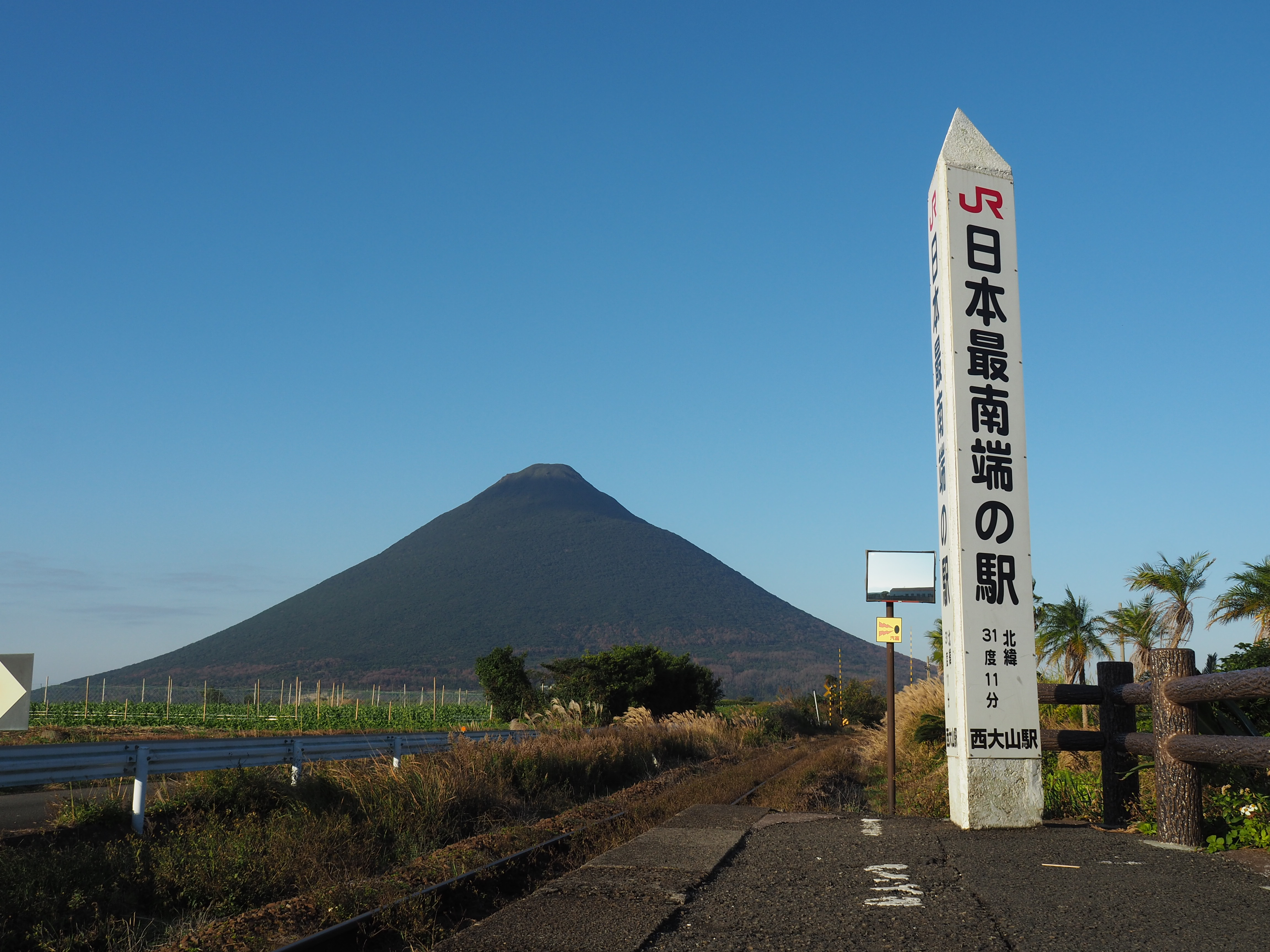
- Marker of Nishi-Ōyama Station being the southernmost station of JR Group, with Kaimon-dake in the background, December 2017

General information
- Location: 602 Yamakawa Ōyama, Ibusuki-shi, Kagoshima-ken 891-0514; Japan
- Coordinates: 31°11′25″N 130°34′35″E
- Operator: JR Kyushu
- Line: ■ Ibusuki Makurazaki Line
- Distance: 56.7 km from Kagoshima-Chūō
- Platforms: 1 side platform
- Tracks: 1

Construction
- Structure type: At grade

History
- Opened: 22 March 1960

Passengers
- FY2015: 44 daily

Services
Preceding station	JR Kyushu	Following station
Ōyama towards Kagoshima-Chūō	Ibusuki Makurazaki Line Local	Satsuma-Kawashiri towards Makurazaki
Location
- Location within Kagoshima Prefecture Location within Japan

Nishi-Ōyama Station (西大山駅, Nishi-Ōyama-eki) is a passenger railway station located in the city of Ibusuki, Kagoshima Prefecture, Japan. It is operated by JR Kyushu. A monument at the station proclaims it to be the southernmost train station of Japan Railways.

== Lines ==
Nishi-Ōyama Station is served by the Ibusuki Makurazaki Line and is located 56.7 km (35.2 mi) from the starting point of the line at Kagoshima-Chūō.

== Layout ==
This is an above-ground station with one side platform and one track. It is an unattended station. There is no station building but only a small short open shelter on the platform.

== Gallery ==
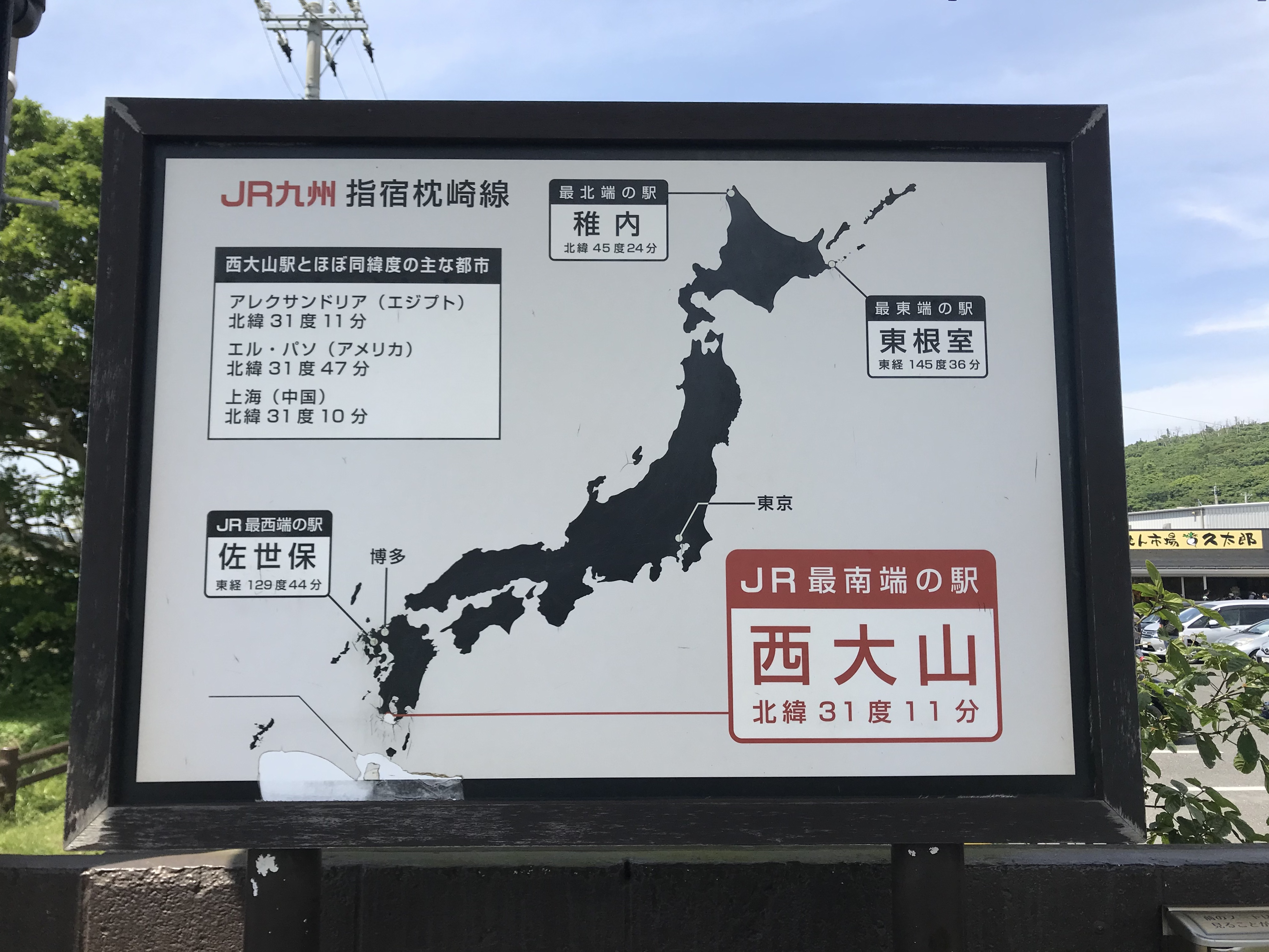
Map of Nishi-Ōyama Station as the southernmost station in Japan.

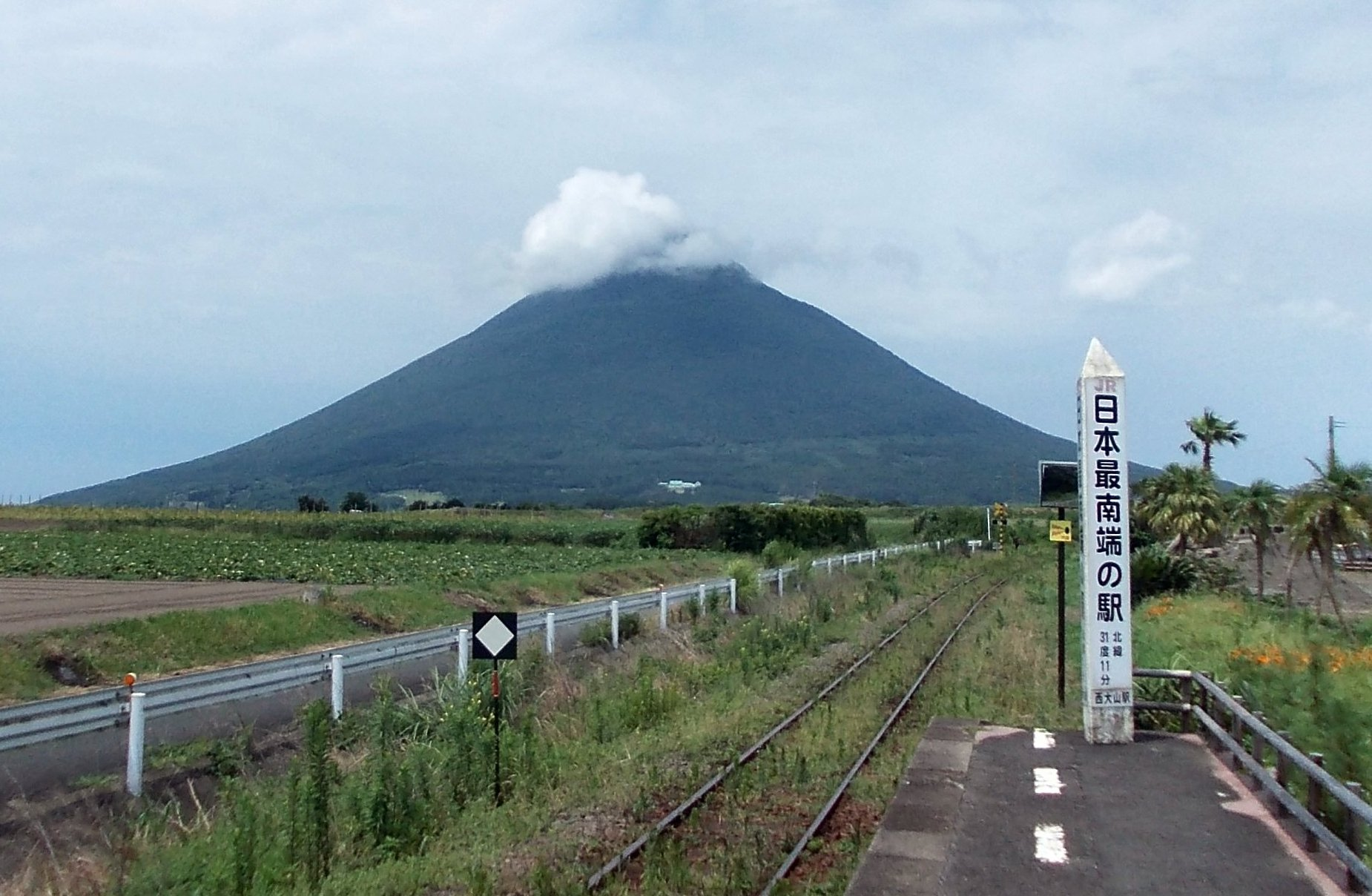
Kaimon-dake seen from Nishi-Ōyama Station

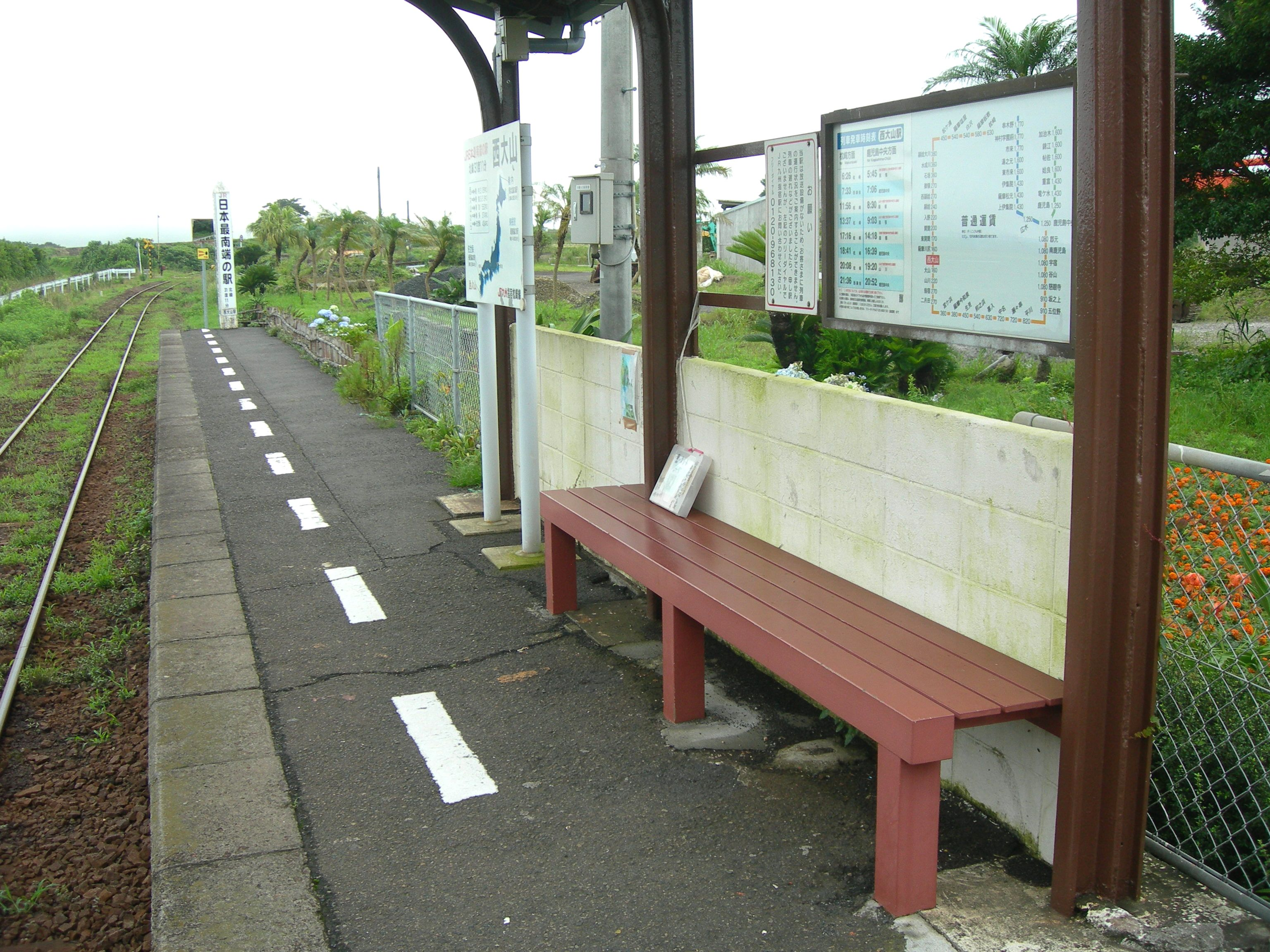
Benches by the platform, June 2010

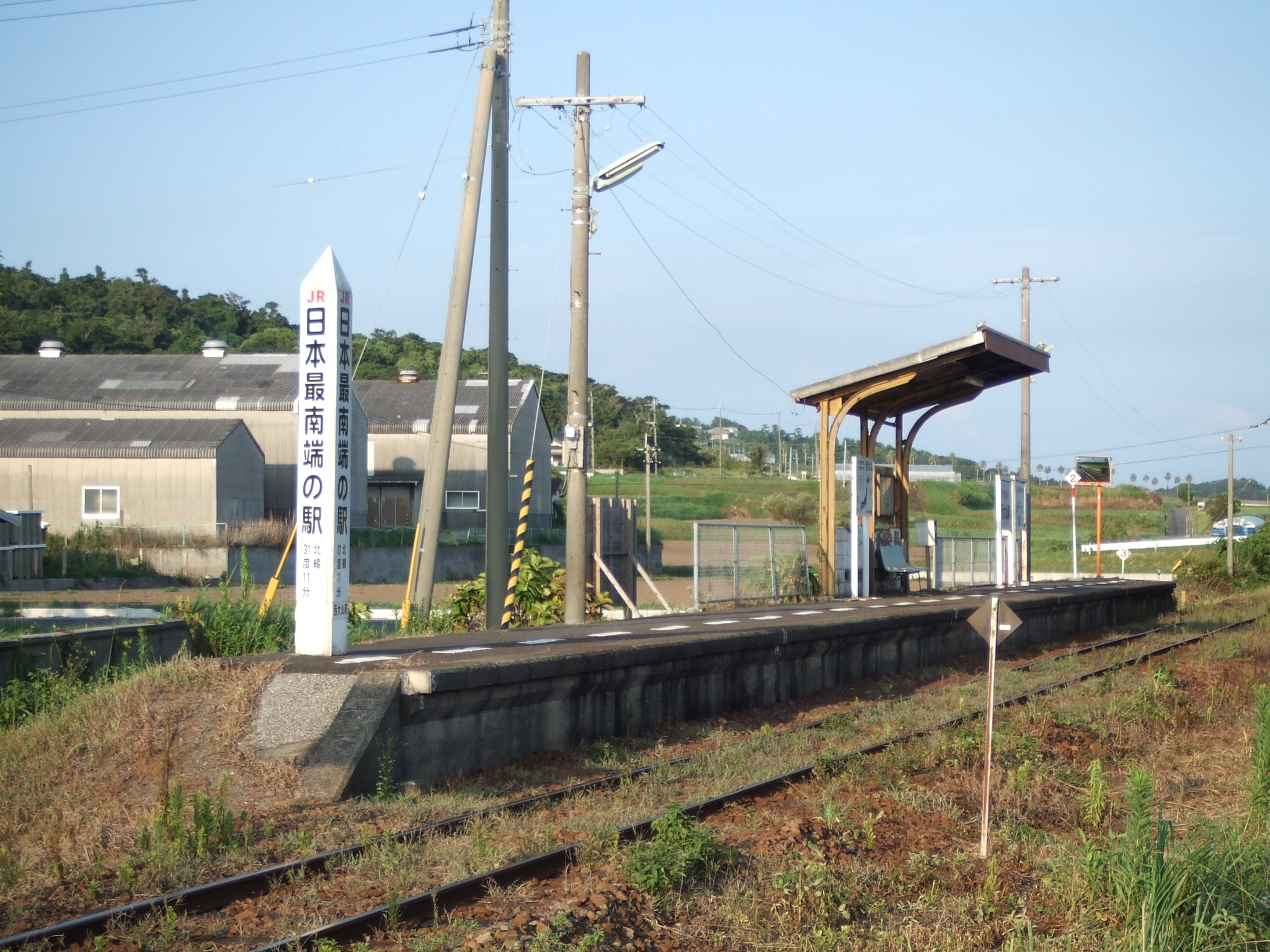
View of the station, August 2006

== History ==
The station opened on 22 March 1960. With the privatization of Japanese National Railways (JNR) on 1 April 1987, the station came under the control of JR Kyushu.

== Passenger statistics ==
In fiscal 2015, the station was used by an average of 44 passengers daily.

== Trivia ==
In 2026, Nishi-Ōyama Station was featured on season 19 of Nebula and YouTube travel competition show “Jet Lag: The Game” where it served as the starting point for a race to Japan's northernmost train station.

== Surrounding area ==
- Japan National Route 226

== See also ==
- List of railway stations in Japan
