= Wiskus =

Wiskus is a surname. Notable people with the surname include:

- Dave Wiskus, American CEO
- Shane Wiskus (born 1998), American artistic gymnast
