= Jordan Harrod =

American scientist (born 1996)

- Born: July 10, 1996 (age 30); Montclair, New Jersey, U.S.
- Education: Montclair High School; Cornell University (B.S.); Harvard and MIT (Ph.D. in progress)
- Occupation: Research scientist

YouTube information
- Channel: Jordan Harrod
- Genres: Education; Popular science; Artificial intelligence
- Subscribers: 86 thousand
- Views: 2.45 million
- Last updated: April 5, 2025
- Website: jordanharrod.com

Jordan Harrod (born July 10, 1996) is an American research scientist and YouTuber who works on neuroengineering, brain-machine interfaces, and machine learning for medicine. A current graduate student at Harvard and MIT, Harrod also runs a YouTube channel to educate the public about artificial intelligence. As of February 2025, her YouTube channel has over 85.6 thousand subscribers and her videos have over 2.42 million total views.

== Early life and education ==
Harrod is from Montclair, New Jersey, where she attended Montclair High School, graduating in 2014. During high school, she was a member of the varsity fencing and tennis teams.

Harrod graduated from Cornell University in 2018 with a B.S. in Biomedical Engineering. During her undergraduate years, she spent one summer doing machine learning research for MRI reconstruction at Stanford University. She is currently a Ph.D. student and NSF Graduate Research Fellow in Harvard-MIT's Health Sciences and Technology program, where she studies using neuromodulation to understand pain and consciousness, and using neurotechnology and machine learning to develop new tools for brain stimulation. She primarily collaborates with anesthesiologist Emery Brown and neuroscientist Ed Boyden.

Harrod has been an invited public speaker at TEDxBeaconStreet, the WITI Women in Technology Summit, and Women Who Code Boston. Her TEDx talk discussed the importance of AI literacy. In 2020, she was featured by Built In as one of nine black women in data science to know.

== YouTube career ==
Harrod's YouTube channel centers around topics and current events in artificial intelligence, AI ethics, and medical technology. She started her YouTube channel because she wasn't able to find a lot of educational resources that were geared towards the average person on how people interact with algorithms. Her most-watched video examines how AI proctors work and whether they can detect online exam cheating.

She is part of the Inquisitive Fellowship, an investment by Vsauce in educational creators on YouTube. In August 2020, AsapSCIENCE mentioned Harrod's channel in a video discussing diversity in science.

Popular YouTuber Tom Scott challenged Harrod to create a deepfake version of him, on a budget of $100, as a collaboration video. Harrod succeeded. She also discussed the technology and the dangers associated with deepfakes.

In October 2020, Harrod joined creator community Standard and started posting her videos to Nebula, a subscription-based video sharing platform, due to YouTube's strict algorithms. "There are definitely topics that I've come across that I think would be challenging to cover on YouTube," she explained to BBC. For example, if she created a video on how algorithms moderate hate speech online, YouTube's algorithms may flag that video's content as hate speech.
