= Sam Denby =

American YouTuber (born 1998)

- Denby in 2026
- Born: Samuel Robert Denby; March 17, 1998 (age 28); Washington, D.C., US
- Citizenship: American; Irish
- Education: University of Edinburgh
- Occupation: YouTuber

YouTube information
- Channels: Wendover Productions; Half As Interesting; Jet Lag: The Game
- Years active: 2015–present
- Genre: Educational entertainment
- Subscribers: 4.92 million (Wendover Productions); 2.95 million (Half as Interesting); 1.09 million (Jet Lag: The Game)
- Views: 843 million (Wendover Productions); 819 million (Half as Interesting); 171 million (Jet Lag: The Game)
- Last updated: October 30, 2026
- Website: wendoverproductions.com

Samuel Robert Denby (born March 17, 1998) is an American YouTuber who created the edutainment YouTube channels Wendover Productions and Half as Interesting, and the travel competition show Jet Lag: The Game, alongside other projects. As of February 12, 2026, Denby has accumulated more than 1.7 billion views and over 8.8 million subscribers across all of his YouTube channels. He is the chief content officer of the streaming service Nebula.

== Career ==
=== Wendover Productions ===
Created in 2010, Denby's primary channel is Wendover Productions. As of June 19, 2026, the channel has over 4.9 million subscribers, 282 published videos, and more than 822 million total video views. His videos most commonly feature the topics of logistics, most notably those of aviation, as well as geography, economics, and the military. The Wendover Productions video about tourism in Iceland received significant attention from Iceland's national newspapers. Wendover Productions is based in Aspen, Colorado.

=== Half as Interesting ===
Launched in August 2017, Denby's second YouTube channel, Half as Interesting, publishes roughly weekly educational releases on a range of topics delivered in a witty style. The videos are often in the 5–10 minute range, and each is dedicated to a single little-known topic. As of May 13, 2026, the channel has over 2.93 million subscribers, 564 published videos, and more than 790 million views.

=== Extremities ===
In June 2019, Denby launched the scripted podcast Extremities about life in some of the world's most isolated and populated locations. The series ran for three seasons – featuring Pitcairn Island, Svalbard, and Saint Helena – and a single episode about Howland Island. After the 2020 COVID-19 pandemic restricted global travel, he produced short video documentaries about 12 more locations for the streaming service Nebula.

=== Nebula ===
By 2018, Denby had begun working with Dave Wiskus to secure sponsorships for his YouTube content, eventually developing a sponsorship agency known as Standard Broadcast LLC. In November 2018, Wiskus reached out to Denby and other Standard creators about the possibility of launching a streaming service, which would later become Nebula.

Denby became a minority owner in Nebula in 2020. In August 2023, Nebula announced that they had appointed him as their chief content officer.

=== Jet Lag: The Game ===
In May 2022, Denby launched the YouTube channel Jet Lag: The Game, which features a travel competition show created by Denby and Half as Interesting writers Ben Doyle (son of writer Larry Doyle) and Adam Chase. Inspired by The Amazing Race, each season consists of three or four players competing in an original game that involves traveling to places and performing challenges toward a strategic goal. As of May 13, 2026, the channel has over 1 million subscribers, 116 videos, and more than 142 million total video views.

=== The Getaway ===
In July 2024, Denby's production company launched The Getaway, a reality game show on Nebula. The game involves six content creators competing on a road trip through the American West, ostensibly a social deduction game in which one of the group is a secret saboteur (much like The Mole or The Traitors), but in fact all six contestants have been assigned that role.

== Personal life ==
Denby was born and raised in Washington, D.C. He went to the University of Edinburgh, where he studied international business. As of 2020, he lived around Carbondale, Colorado.
