= Ōyama Station (Kagoshima) =

Railway station in Ibusuki, Kagoshima Prefecture, Japan

Ōyama Station 大山駅
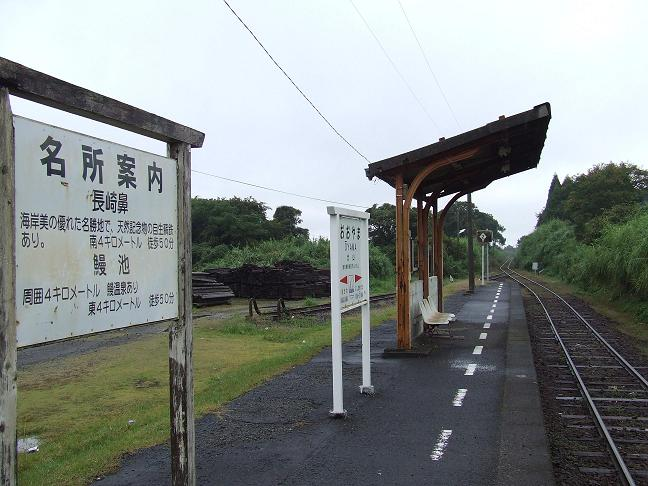
- Ōyama Station

General information
- Location: Yamakawa Ōyama, Ibusuki-shi, Kagoshima-ken 891-0514; Japan
- Coordinates: 31°11′42″N 130°35′57″E
- Operator: JR Kyushu
- Line: ■ Ibusuki Makurazaki Line
- Distance: 54.2 km from Kagoshima-Chūō
- Platforms: 1 side platform

Other information
- Status: Unstaffed
- Website: Official website

History
- Opened: 22 March 1960

Passengers
- FY2015: 40 daily

Services
Preceding station	JR Kyushu	Following station
Yamakawa towards Kagoshima-Chūō	Ibusuki Makurazaki Line	Nishi-Ōyama towards Makurazaki
Location
- Location within Kagoshima Prefecture Location within Japan

Ōyama Station (大山駅, Ōyama-eki) is a passenger railway station located in the city of Ibusuki, Kagoshima Prefecture, Japan. It is operated by JR Kyushu.

== Lines ==
The station is served by the Ibusuki Makurazaki Line and is located 54.2 km from the starting point of the line at Kagoshima-Chūō.

== Layout ==
This is an above-ground station with one side platform and one track. It is an unattended station. The is no station building but only a small short open shelter on the platform.Formerly it was an interchange station with one island platform and two tracks. Traces of this can still be seen in the wiring within the premises, and materials such as sleepers and bridges can be seen piled up within the premises.

== History ==
The station was opened on 22 March 1960 as a station on the JNR Ibusuki Line. With the privatization of Japanese National Railways (JNR), the successor of JGR, on 1 April 1987, JR Kyushu took over control of the station.

== Passenger statistics ==
In fiscal 2015, the station was used by an average of 40 passengers daily.

== Surrounding area ==
- Kyushu Electric Power Company's Yamakawa Geothermal Power Plant

== See also ==
- List of railway stations in Japan
