= Toby Hendy =

New Zealand science communicator and YouTuber (born 1995)

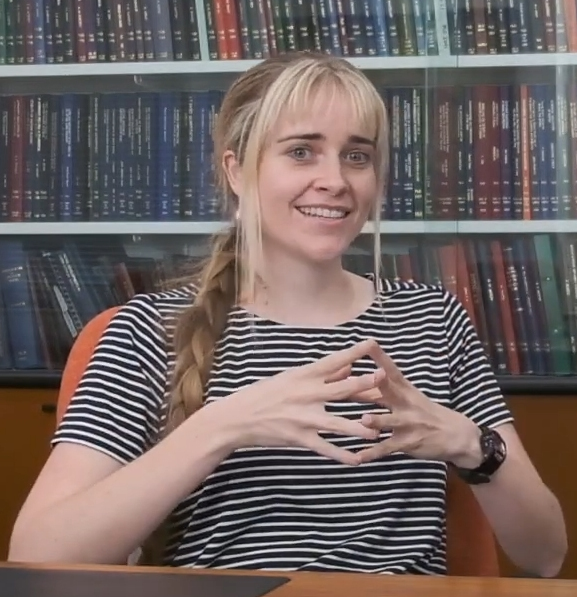
- Hendy in 2019
- Born: 1995 (age 30–31)
- Education: University of Canterbury (BS); Australian National University (Honours)
- Occupations: Science communicator; YouTuber

YouTube information
- Channel: Tibees
- Years active: 2011–present
- Genres: Science; education
- Subscribers: 1.34 million
- Views: 197.98 million
- Last updated: 5 July 2026
- Website: tobyhendy.com

Toby Hendy (born 1995), known online as Tibees /ˈtɪbiːz/, is a New Zealand science communicator and YouTuber who focuses on educational content relating to physics, mathematics and astronomy. She is based in Australia.

== Early life and education ==
=== School ===
Hendy attended Katikati College in the Bay of Plenty, New Zealand. In 2011, she was selected by the Royal Society of New Zealand as one of two national delegates to attend the USA International Space Camp in Huntsville, Alabama. In 2012, she won first place in the secondary school category of the NZ Eureka Awards for Science Communication.

=== University ===
Hendy obtained a Bachelor of Science, majoring in Physics and Mathematics, at the University of Canterbury. She was awarded an Aurora Astronomy Scholarship that enabled her to take an overseas trip to NASA's Jet Propulsion Laboratory, Caltech, Carnegie Observatory, UCLA, Macdonald Observatory Texas, University of British Columbia, NRC Observatory Victoria and CFHT Hawaii.

Hendy went on to do her Honours year at the Australian National University in Canberra. She received first class honours with a grade of 93/100 for her thesis entitled ‘Examining the mechanical response of Arabidopsis thaliana using nanoindentation and Finite Element Modelling’. In 2017, Hendy started a PhD at ANU focusing on using nanoindentation to examine the mechanical response of plant cells to applied pressure. She was awarded a Westpac Future Leader's Scholarship. During her time as a PhD student she placed runner-up in the Australian national finals of the FameLab science communication competition for her presentation 'Poking Plants'. In 2018, Hendy discontinued her PhD studies to pursue YouTube full-time.

== Career ==
Hendy has been uploading videos to YouTube since high school. In August 2020, Hendy announced that she was working on a mathematical stop-motion short film Finding X, supported by the Screen Australia Skip Ahead initiative. It was released in January 2022.

In 2023, Hendy appeared on season 5 of the travel competition show Jet Lag: The Game, which was filmed in New Zealand. She returned for season 10, which was filmed in Australia, and released in 2024, and for season 15 which was filmed in Western Europe, and released in 2025.

In 2025 the International Astronomical Union's Minor Planet Center gave asteroid 22955 the name Tibees, Hendy's nickname, in honour of her science communication outreach.

In May 2025, Hendy announced that she had written a book, A Guide To Making Friends in the Fourth Dimension, intended for release in July 2025. It was published in November 2025. The book has won a Sloan Science prize.

In May 2026, Hendy announced that she had written a science fiction novel, Alpha Creek, in collaboration with Len Vlahos. It was published in September 2026.

== Awards ==
- 2012 — NZ Eureka Awards for Science Communication
- 2013 — UC Aurora Astronomy Scholarship
- 2015 — Haydon Prize for top graduating physics student
- 2017 — Westpac Future Leader's Scholarship
- 2018 — FameLab Australia runner-up
- 2020 — Screen Australia Skip Ahead Grant
- 2024 — Young Australian of the Year nominee for Queensland
