= Brian McManus (YouTuber) =

Irish YouTuber

- McManus speaking at Open Sauce 2025
- Born: Brian McManus; Galway, Ireland
- Occupations: Engineer; YouTube personality
- Years active: 2013–present
- Awards: Space Pioneer Award

YouTube information
- Channels: Real Engineering; Real Science
- Genre: Engineering
- Subscribers: 5.02 million (Real Engineering); 2.05 million (Real Science)
- Views: 689 million (Real Engineering); 262 million (Real Science)
- Last updated: January 20, 2026

Brian McManus (sometimes spelled Mac Mághnais) is an Irish YouTuber, producing the channels Real Engineering and Real Science where he discusses biomedical and aeronautical engineering.

== Early life and engineering career ==
McManus attended secondary school at St Joseph's Patrician College, and was later awarded an undergraduate degree in biomedical engineering from National University of Ireland Galway in 2011. He subsequently completed a master's degree in aeronautical engineering at the University of Limerick, studying composite failure prediction.

== YouTube ==
McManus' YouTube channel Real Engineering was created to explain and analyze various engineering topics,, primarily focusing on aviation, aerospace, and energy. After teaching himself animation in 2013, one of his first videos Why are Plane Windows Round? went viral and garnered significant coverage in the popular press. McManus has worked full-time on the channel since 2016, with video content production based in the west of Ireland, supported by four full-time staff and additional freelancers.

=== Recognition ===
McManus was awarded the 2024 Space Pioneer Award in the Electronic Mass Media category from the US National Space Society.

=== Controversy ===
The Real Engineering video The Unlikely Rise of the Indian Space Program, and McManus' subsequent comments, caused controversy in India due to a map that did not cover the full extent of India's territorial claims.

=== Related businesses ===
McManus co-founded the creator-owned video platform Nebula after encountering challenges with monetization, and age restriction for non-violent content on YouTube. He also runs an animation studio, Throttle Media, which provides animation production and science communication services to engineering companies.

== Personal life ==
McManus lives in Texas.
