= Patrick Willems (filmmaker) =

American video essayist and filmmaker

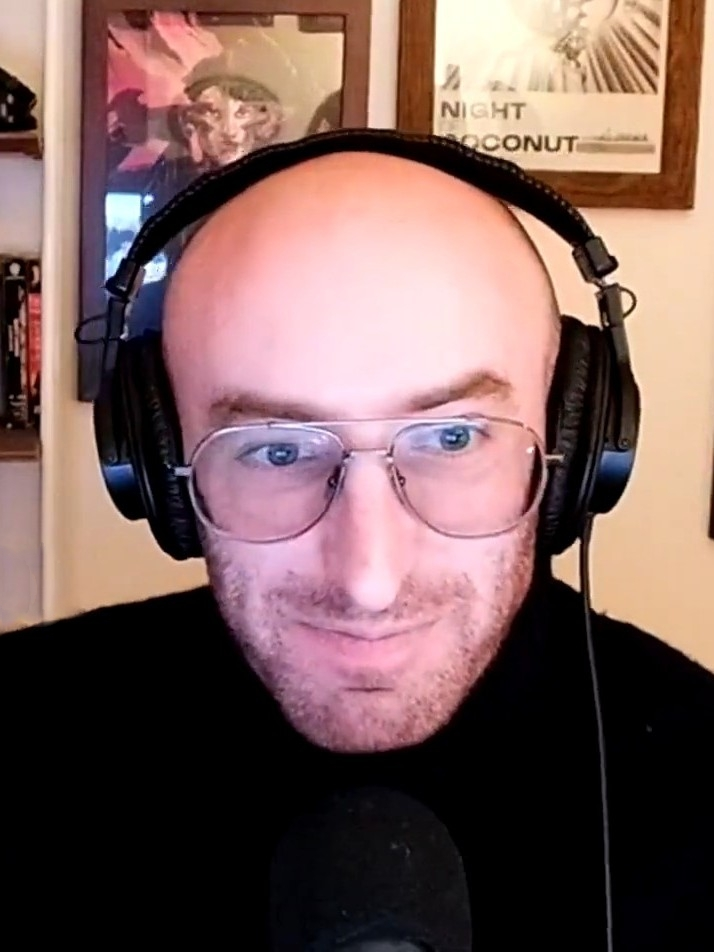
- Willems in 2025
- Born: September 29, 1987 (age 39); Saratoga Springs, New York, U.S.
- Education: Oberlin College
- Occupations: video essayist, filmmaker
- Years active: 2011–present

YouTube information
- Channel: Patrick (H) Willems
- Years active: 2011 - present
- Genres: Film criticism; video essay
- Subscribers: 631,000
- Views: 77.8 million
- Last updated: June 14, 2026
- Website: www.patrickwillems.com

Patrick Willems (born September 29, 1987) is an American video-essayist and filmmaker. On his YouTube channel, "Patrick (H) Willems", he initially posted short films before transitioning into producing video essays in 2016. His video essays are about films and the state of the film industry. His directorial credits include Night of the Coconut (2022) and The Dinner Plan (2025), both released on Nebula. He was named Director of Scripted Development at Nebula in 2025.

== Early life ==
According to Willems, his mother came to the United States from County Clare, Ireland in 1980, and met his father in Saratoga Springs, where Willems was born and raised.

== Career ==
=== Initial short films ===
While attending Saratoga Springs High School, Willems formed a film club with fellow student Max Rouzier, with whom he hosted a school film festival. After graduating from Oberlin College in 2010 with a degree in Cinema Studies, he and Rouzier formed an independent film production company, Lumberjack Films. Willems produced various commercials and short films with the company.

Between 2013 and 2015, Willems produced a number of short films which paid homage to various well-known productions and filmmakers. These included "What if Wes Anderson Directed X-Men?", "What if Werner Herzog directed Ant-Man?", and "Breaking Bad Jr.", which cast children as the leads of the TV series Breaking Bad.

=== Video essays ===
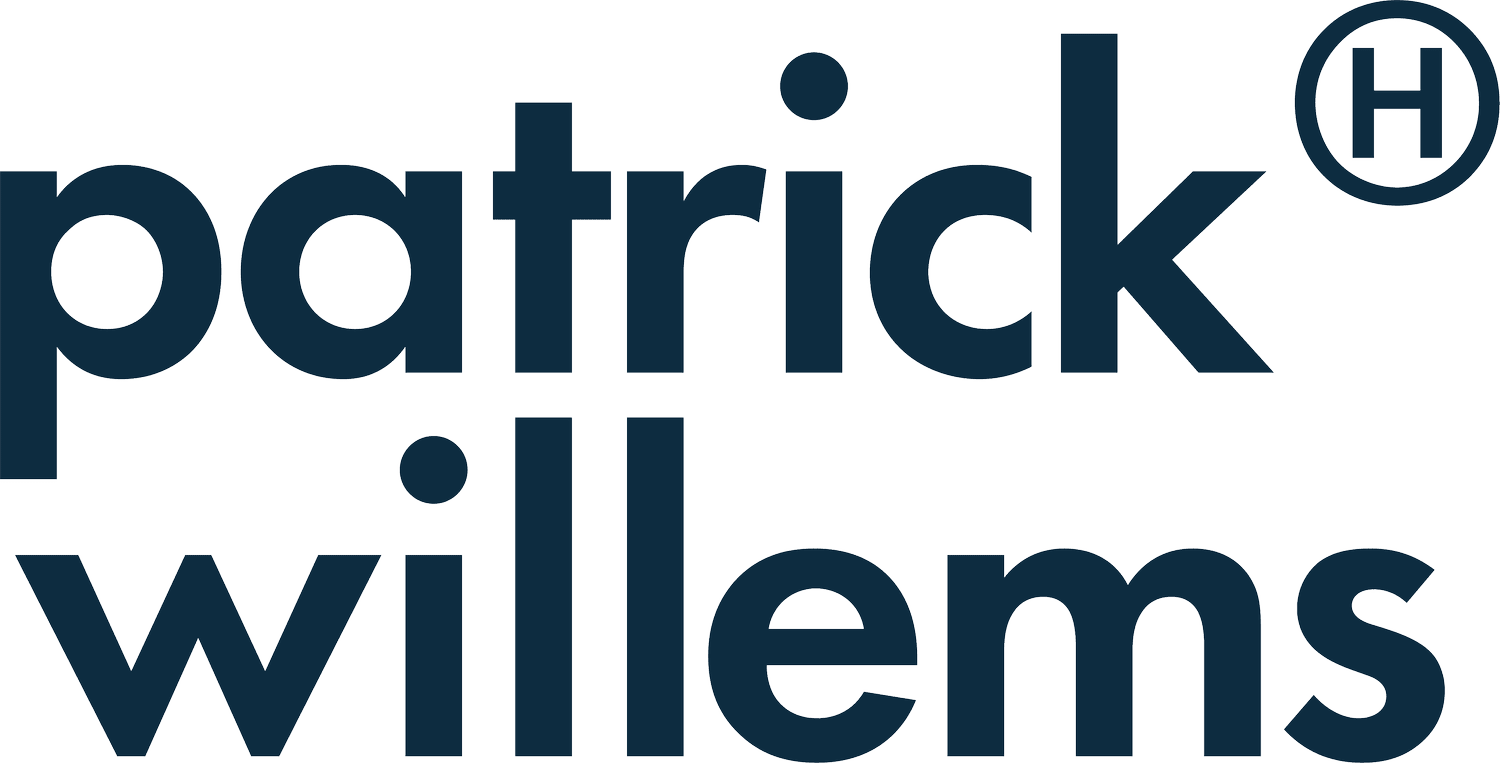
The logo of Willems' YouTube channel.

In 2016, Willems uploaded his first video essay, which critiqued the color grading of the MCU films. He has continued to produce video essays on a wide variety of film topics since. In 2019, he collaborated with video-essayist Mikey Neumann on a two-part series covering the Mission: Impossible films.

In 2023 he produced The Patrick (H) Willems Star Wars Holiday special, which featured previous channel guests.

=== Film projects ===
Starting in 2020, during video essays, Willems began incorporating short serialized segments about a coconut named Charl. The story arc closed out in his feature directorial debut, Night of the Coconut. The film was released on June 17, 2022 on the streaming platform Nebula.

In 2025, Willems released his short film The Dinner Plan, starring Griffin Newman, John Hodgman, and Miriam Shor, onto Nebula.

In 2025 it was announced Willems would direct an episode of the Nebula anthology series Sub/Liminal, executive produced by Dan Jinks. Later in the same year he was appointed by Nebula as Director of Scripted Development.

In August 2026, Willems' short film Power Trip debuted at the 2026 HollyShorts Film Festival. On 2 September, Scott Feinberg of The Hollywood Reporter listed it among his predicted nominees for Best Live Action Short Film at the 99th Academy Awards.

== Personal life ==
Willems is based in Brooklyn. His parents frequently appear in his videos. He has a sister Mary.

== Reception ==
Colin Gorenstein of Salon praised Willems' 2015 "What if Wes Anderson Directed X-Men?" short film, saying that his imitation of Anderson's visual style "checks across the board". In Vulture, Sean Fitz-Gerald described it as having "just the right hint of auteur-esque pretension".

In Ars Technica, Nathan Matisse praised Willems' essays. Caroline Seide of The A.V. Club praised a 2017 video covering the action filmmaking of director Steven Spielberg as "another thoughtful look at cinema" from Willems. In Pajiba, Alberto Cox Délano praised Willems' videos for their thorough analysis and research, entertaining narrative segments, and breadth of their coverage of the film medium. Mike Redmond praised a 2020 video discussing the Star Wars franchise following the release of the film The Rise of Skywalker, calling it a "calm, rational examination".

In International Policy Digest, Will Mann reviewed Willems' directorial feature debut Night of the Coconut. Mann praised the film's production values, and described it as "more focused and effective" than other similar film productions made by other YouTube creators. Mann also enjoyed the film's music, humor, and performances of the lead actors, which he stated "mostly work". However, Mann stated that the film would potentially be hard to follow for viewers who were not familiar with the Charl story arc from Willems' past videos. In a review for We Live Entertainment, Aaron Neuwirth praised Willems' direction and the film's humor, acting, and conclusion to the Charl storyline, calling it a "fun diversion".

== Filmography ==
Year	Title	Director	Writer	Notes	Ref.
2022	Night of the Coconut	Yes	Yes	Also editor and cinematographer	
2025	The Dinner Plan	Yes	No	Short film	
2026	Power Trip	Yes	No	Short film	
