= Hospental Castle =

Medieval castle in Hospental, Uri, Switzerland

Hospental Tower
- Hospental
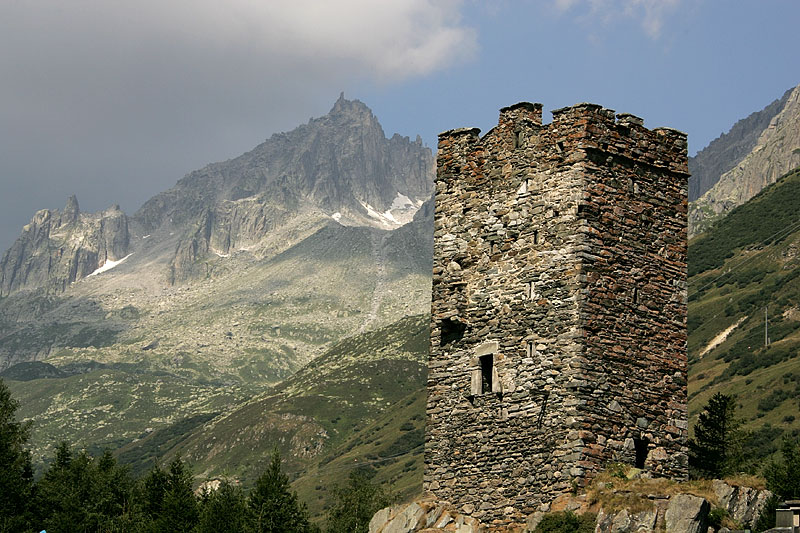
- Tower with the Spitzberg in background (2006)

Site information
- Type: Spur castle
- Code: CH-UR
- Condition: Ruin, partially conserved

Location
- Coordinates: 46°37′07″N 8°34′00″E
- Height: 1,509 m above the sea

Site history
- Built: 13th century

Hospental Castle or Langobarden Towers is a ruined medieval castle in the municipality of Hospental in the canton of Uri in Switzerland. It is a Swiss heritage site of national significance.

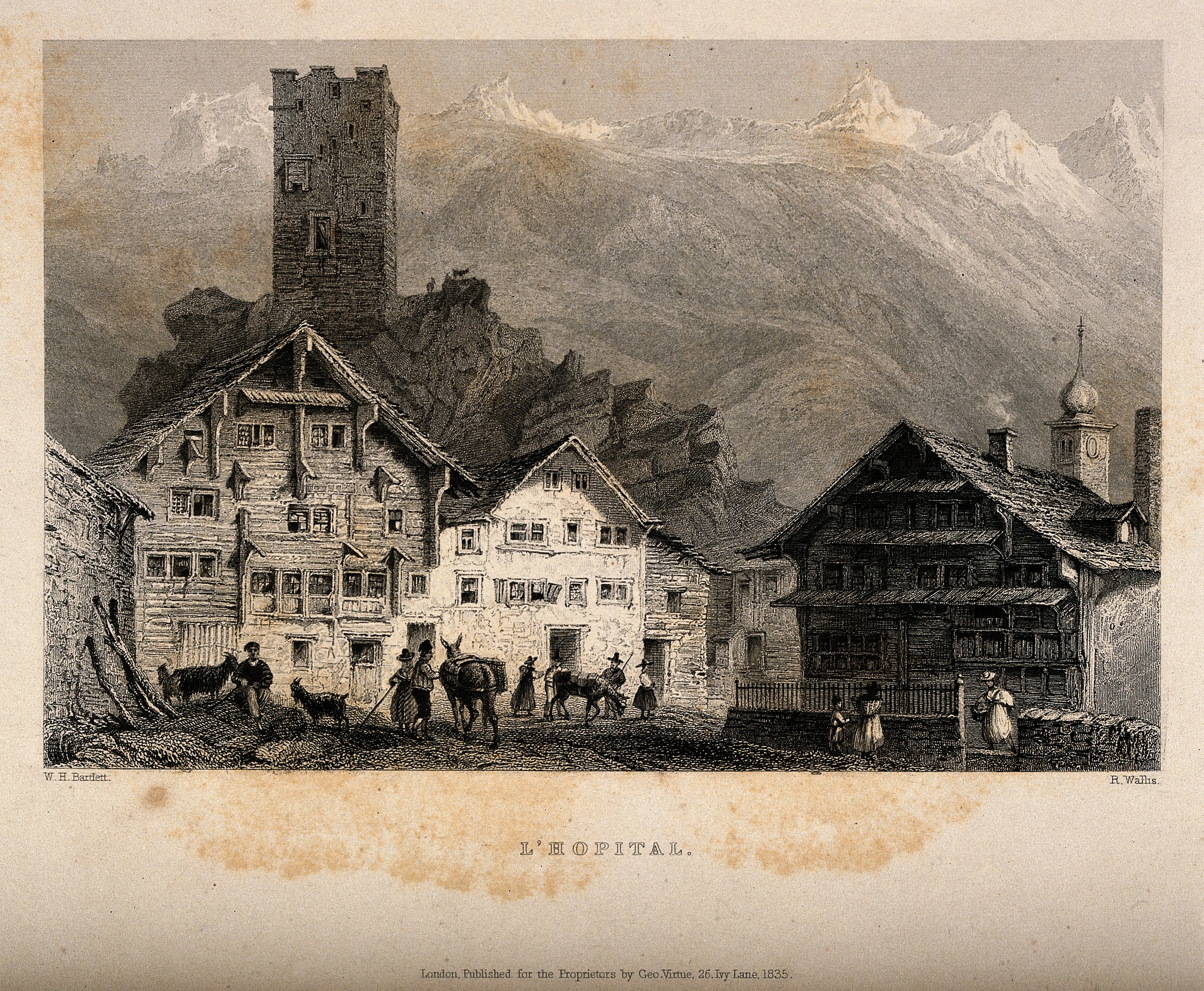
L'hopital, early 19th century

== History ==
The tower, which was made of uncut stones, was erected in the 13th century for the Hospental family, originally serving as a watch tower. The castle most likely did not serve as means to control the flow of inbound people (e.g., as a customs facility), but rather as a prison. From the 15th century, Hospental castle was no longer inhabited and gradually fell into a dilapidated state. In 1898, it was widely restored. The site is declared as a cultural heritage site of national importance.

== Description ==
The tower is built with a tall entrance on the first floor. Clearly visible to this day are the so called garderobe, the locations of the fireplaces, as well as artificially created ditch, which serves to protect from enemy approaches. The rain water that comes from the crenellated roof on the third floor was collected in a cistern.

== See also ==
- List of castles and fortresses in Switzerland
