= Nebula (streaming service) =

Video streaming service

- Available in: English
- Founded: May 23, 2019; 7 years ago
- Headquarters: New York City, New York Denver, Colorado, United States
- Area served: Worldwide
- Owners: Nebula Entertainment & Broadcasting LLC; Curiosity Stream has minority stake
- Founder: Dave Wiskus
- CEO: Dave Wiskus
- Total equity: $50+ million
- Website: nebula.tv
- Registration: Subscription required to access entire library.
- Users: 680,000 (December 2023)
- Current status: Active

Nebula is a video-on-demand streaming service provider. Launched by the Standard Broadcast content management agency in 2019 to complement its creators' other distribution channels (primarily YouTube), the platform has since accumulated over 680,000 subscribers, making it the largest creator-owned internet streaming platform.

== History ==
Dave Wiskus and various creators established Standard Broadcast LLC as a creator-owned alternative to multi-channel networks, assisting its members in the content management and marketing aspects of the creator economy. Originating from Standard creator community discussions on means of diminishing reliance to dominant platforms such as YouTube, Nebula launched on 23 May 2019 with 75 creators. The platform has since, as of late 2023, accumulated over 650,000 subscribers and 175 creators who collectively have over 120 million YouTube subscribers.

Dave Wiskus, CEO of Nebula, at the premiere of season 19 of Nebula show Jet Lag: The Game

In September 2021, Curiosity Stream acquired a minority stake in Nebula, valuing the company at over $50 million. Nebula subsequently collaborated with Curiosity Stream to promote a bundle subscription for both streaming services. In 2022, Nebula expanded its Nebula Originals catalog, launching Nebula Classes in May for paid online courses and Nebula First in October for early access to videos that are later released on other platforms.

In 2024, Nebula announced the creation of Nebula Motion Pictures in a goal to increase premium programming on the platform. Cinematographer Valentina Vee was hired as the company's director of motion pictures. This began steps the company made to "chart a streamlined path from digital creator (UGC) to filmmaker creating premium content." The company also launched a new division Nebula News, aimed at creating "fact-based news content."

== Programming ==
Some video essayists have published content on Nebula that may be censored or removed on YouTube, such as Maggie Mae Fish's Unrated and Broey Deschanel's Taboo on Screen, both of which cover sexuality in film.

Nebula funded an Off West End play, The Prince (2022), by Abigail Thorn. It broke even through ticket sales before opening night. After performances at the Southwark Playhouse in September and October 2022, a recording of the play was released in February 2023, with a remastered version following later in the year. The play received awards from The Offies and BroadwayWorld. In November 2023, Wiskus said Nebula is working towards becoming a Netflix competitor instead of a YouTube competitor, with Thorn's short film Dracula's Ex-Girlfriend set to be released exclusively on Nebula.

YouTuber Patrick H. Willems was appointed the Director of Scripted Development after having previously released his feature directorial debut, Night of the Coconut on Nebula on June 3, 2022.

A portion of the company's revenue is spent on its other subsidiary, Standard Studios, an in-house production company that assists creators with production, editing, and graphics for both Nebula Originals and cross-platform videos. Creators can sell merchandise through the website.

In 2025, Wiskus announced their upcoming first scripted original series in collaboration with Academy Award-and-Emmy-winning producer Dan Jinks titled "Sub/liminal".

== Reception ==
Nebula received nominations for the "Best Influencer Campaign" in the 10th and 12th Annual Streamy Awards as well as "Best Creator Product" in the 11th Annual Streamy Awards. In 2023, Sight and Sound's video essay poll featured nine Nebula nominations across seven unique videos. Three of the videos were published simultaneously to YouTube, three were published later, and one had a shorter version published on YouTube.

In a 2022 review for PCMag, Jordan Minor said its basic tier was better value than YouTube Premium but its classes worse value than MasterClass. Minor praised the interface, including accessibility features and VPN compatibility, though he critiqued the lack of age ratings or controls. Minor praised the creator-owned nature of Nebula, but said its limited exclusive content was a limitation.

In March 2024, FastCompany named Nebula one of the most innovative companies in video.
