= Look-alike contest =

Viral phenomenon about celebrities

In late 2024, multiple news outlets reported a large rise in the prevalence of look-alike contests across the United States, United Kingdom, Ireland and Australia, as well as later contests in India and Brazil, which were attributed to the initial popularity of a Timothée Chalamet look-alike contest in October that year. Celebrities at the center of these contests included Paul Mescal, Jeremy Allen White, Zendaya and political figure Jack Schlossberg, though fictional characters such as Tommy Shelby were also included as well as other figures such as Luigi Mangione, the suspect in the killing of UnitedHealthcare CEO Brian Thompson.

They were often advertised using flyers and held in town squares, and mostly held in the wake of the 2024 United States presidential election. While look-alike contests have existed since the early 1900s at the latest, these contests sparked various responses and analysis as to their sudden, grassroots rise in popularity, as well as commentary on third places, dating culture, remakes and sequels, and the inclusion of women and racial minorities in the contests.

== Timothée Chalamet contest ==
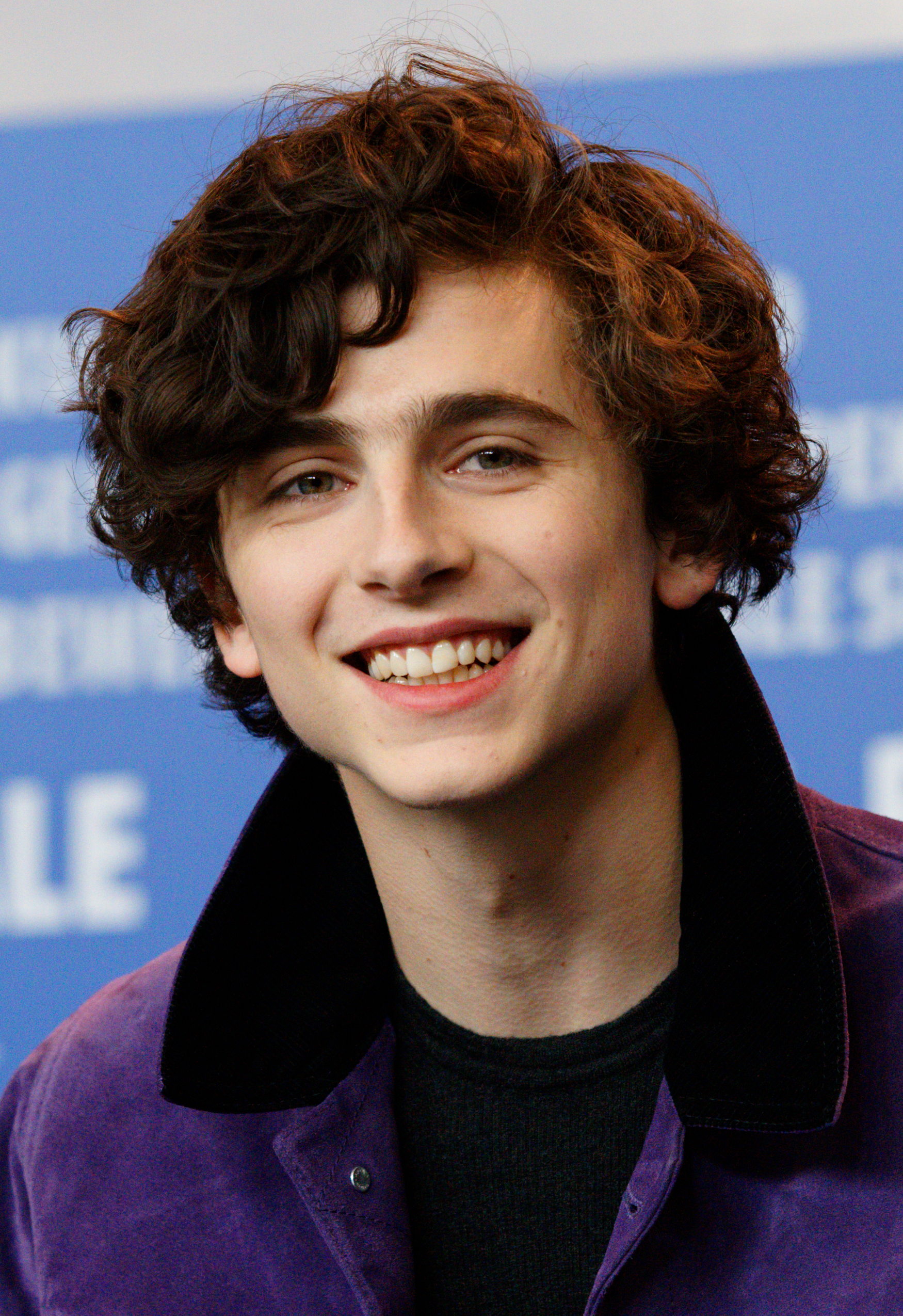
Timothée Chalamet

The initial event, named the Timothée Chalamet Look-alike Contest of 2024, was held in Washington Square Park in Manhattan, New York, by YouTuber Anthony Po on October 27, 2024. Po, a 23-year-old YouTuber with over 1.8 million followers, had previously gained online attention for eating cheese balls as "Cheeseball Man" in Union Square.

To advertise the event, Po posted flyers around New York which featured QR codes that led to an anonymous invite on website Partiful, causing speculation on social media and over 2,000 RSVPs on this invite. Chalamet himself was sent photos of these fliers and saw them while shooting for the film Marty Supreme in the city; he later stated that "there were posters everywhere in New York," and that one of the fliers for the event had to be moved as it was in the background of a shot. On the campaigning platform Cajole, a page was created which offered to pay $5,000 to charity if Chalamet himself attended and competed in the contests; this reached its goal on October 23. Timothée Chalamet fan accounts, most prominently Club Chalamet, were credited with popularising the contest through large social media followings and encouragements to attend.

On October 26, a day before the Chalamet contest, Po hosted a contest for look-alikes of the YouTuber Kai Cenat, which 20 to 50 people attended. Several hundred people attended the event itself, an unexpectedly large number for its organizers. Several women attended the event with signs and t-shirts that declared that they were single or included their phone numbers. Prior to the contest itself beginning, the New York City Police Department (NYPD) gave a dispersal order due to a lack of an event permit. Po arrived riding a penny-farthing bicycle and dressed as Charlie Chaplin, referencing Chaplin's famous loss at his own look-alike contest. He led part of the group to the nearby Mercer Playground, by New York University, to begin the event. Back at Washington Square Park, the real Timothée Chalamet made a brief appearance, posing for pictures with the various look-alikes for less than a minute before leaving. The NYPD detained four people, including one look-alike contestant for disorderly conduct; he was placed in handcuffs and put in a patrol car.

Contestants included a corgi in a wig nicknamed "Timothée Corglamet", as well as multiple look-alikes dressed as Chalamet's characters from Wonka and Dune, and one contestant, Vincent Panetta, as Chalamet's Bob Dylan from the upcoming A Complete Unknown. After judging from YouTuber and TikToker Benjamin De Almeida, the contestants were reduced to four finalists, all of which were asked about their proficiency in French, plans to improve the world and romantic intentions with Kylie Jenner. 21-year-old Miles Mitchell won the $50 prize for dressing as Chalamet's Willy Wonka; another contestant claimed that Mitchell won because he was giving out chocolate, though Po credited Mitchell's "charisma". Mitchell was also given a 5-foot-tall comically large trophy worth $250.

The New York City Department of Parks and Recreation fined Po $500 after the event. He has stated he does not have the intention to host any other look-alike contests, as "people would know it was [him]." Chalamet's team offered to pay the fine, and relayed a message from the actor: "They basically [said] like, 'We thought it was awesome. Thanks so much, It was all good and fun' ". Po declined their offer, as the money was already covered by Partiful. Production costs for the event ascended to $4,000. The contest was later parodied on Saturday Night Live. In mid-December, Chalamet met Mitchell in person during a screening of A Complete Unknown in New York. Mitchell also walked the red carpet at the 82nd Golden Globe Awards in 2025 with Glen Powell look-alike contest winner Maxwell Braunstein.

== Following contests ==
Numerous similar contests took place the following November. Many of these contests were similarly held in public squares and advertised with flyers. These simple flyers were often printed in black and white and featured an image of the contests' subjects. Alongside this, some women jokingly advertised impromptu contests in their own bedrooms or inboxes online. On November 21, Rolling Stone reported that "dozens more contests are scheduled between now and the end of the year".

=== 2024 ===
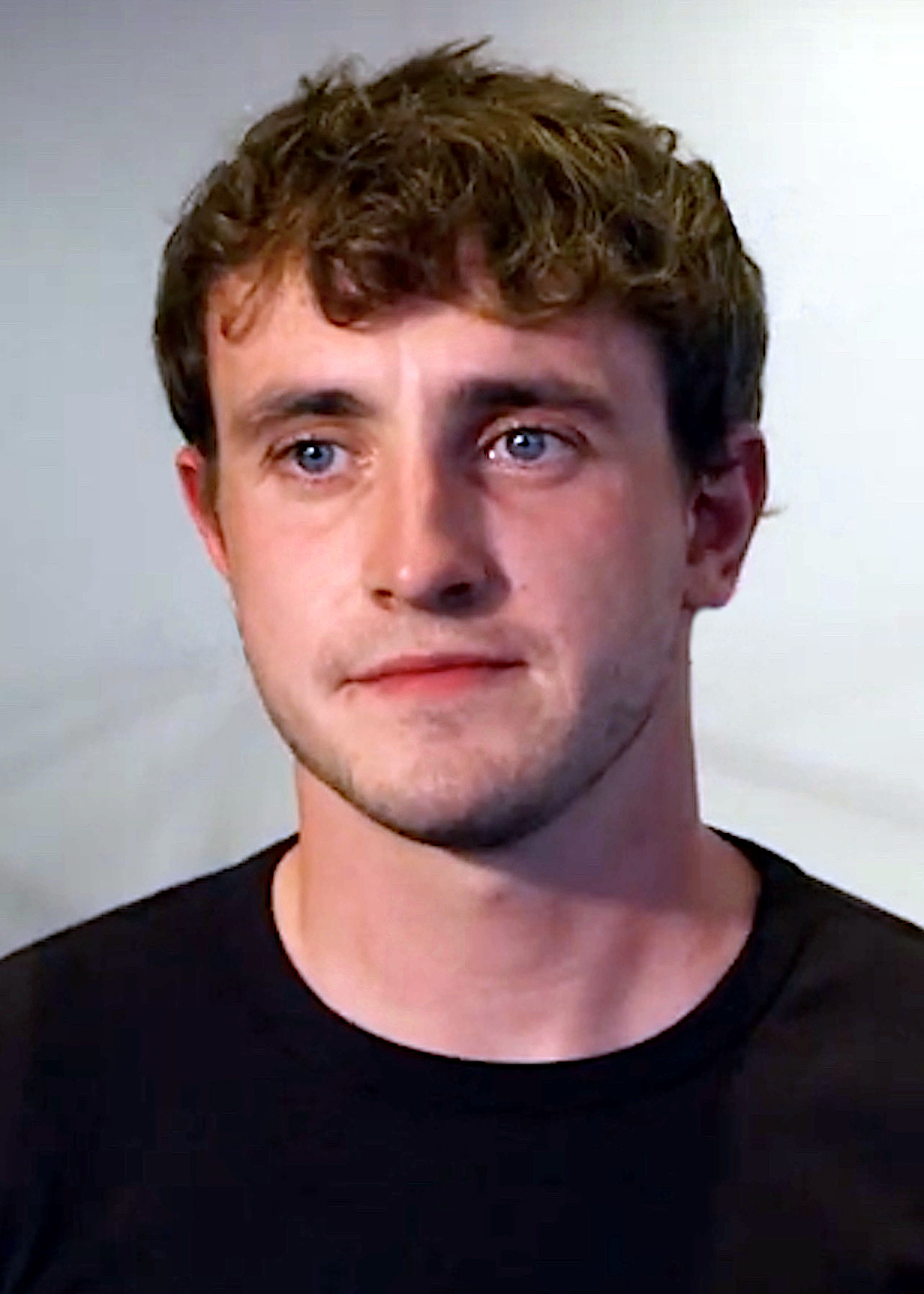
The Dublin Paul Mescal contest was the first notable event to follow the initial Chalamet contest

==== November ====
- A Paul Mescal contest took place outside Light House Cinema in Smithfield Square, Dublin on November 7, hours prior to Mescal appearing at the cinema for the Irish premiere of Gladiator II. It had initially been advertised by a TikTok account under the name @paulmescallookalike. Of 7 contestants, the contest was won by 25-year-old Jack Wall O’Reilly. He was dubbed "Earbuds Paul" as he had copied Mescal's signature use of earphones, and was awarded a choice of "20 euro or three pints". Mescal congratulated O'Reilly after his win in a surprise call on BBC Radio 2.
- A Harry Styles contest was organized in London's Soho Square on November 9 by journalist Katrina Mirpuri. It featured 12 contestants and a £50 prize, and attracted around 500 spectators. 22-year-old musician Oscar Journeaux won and was given his prize by Eyal Booker.

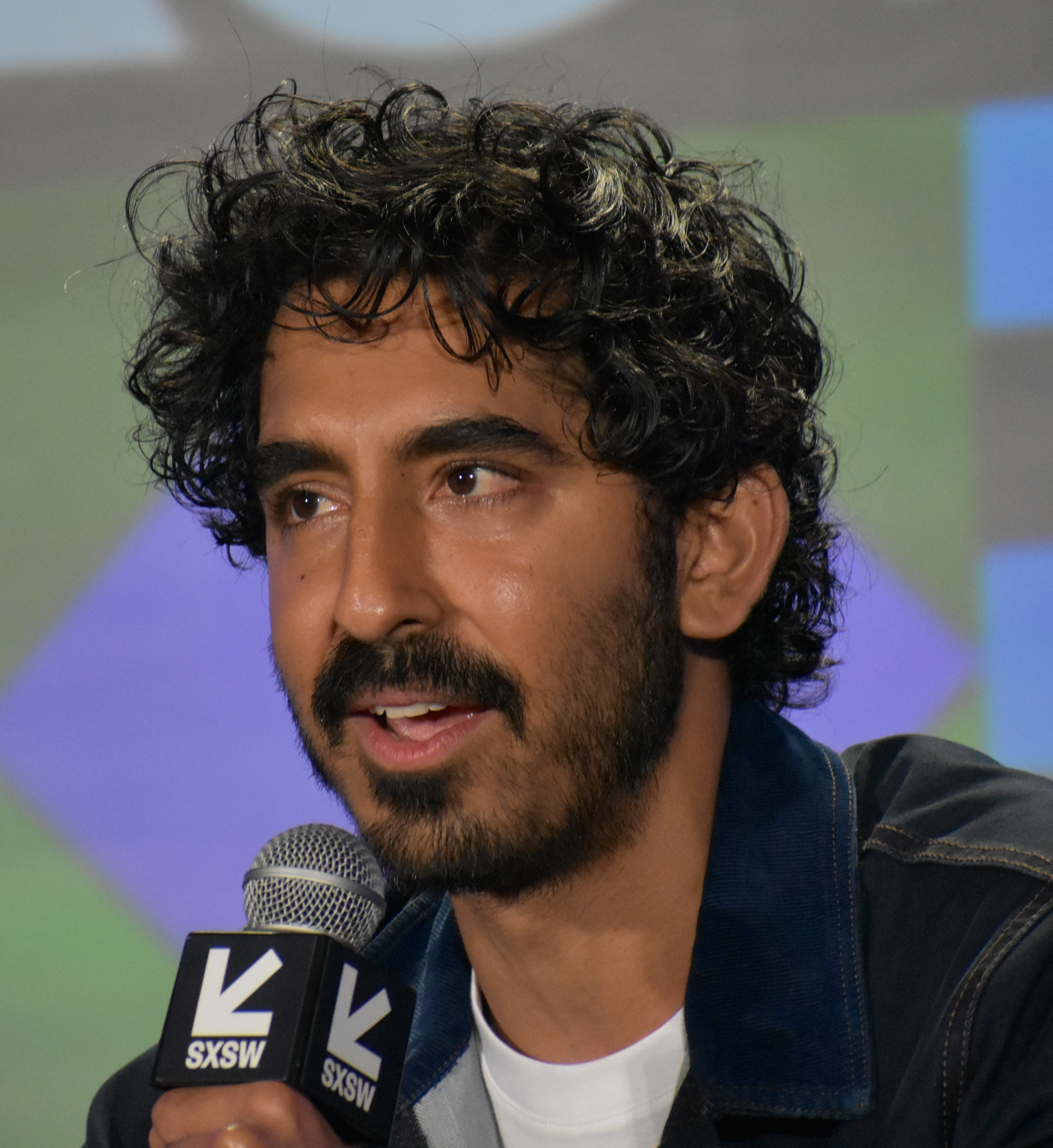
Dev Patel's contest attempted to bring South Asian representation

- A Dev Patel contest was hosted on November 10 in San Francisco's Dolores Park. Its organizers had originally planned a Robert Pattinson contest, but recognized that the contestants thus far had only centered around white celebrities and sought to represent a South Asian celebrity. Contestants danced Patel's dance from Slumdog Millionaire. It was won by Jaipreet Hundal; he received $50 and a statue from Patel's film Monkey Man. Internet activity around this event was comparatively sparse. Patel later said he was "surprised more than five people showed up", and that "hopefully, [he was] just the gateway to this happening to all sorts of brilliant actors of different races and genders".

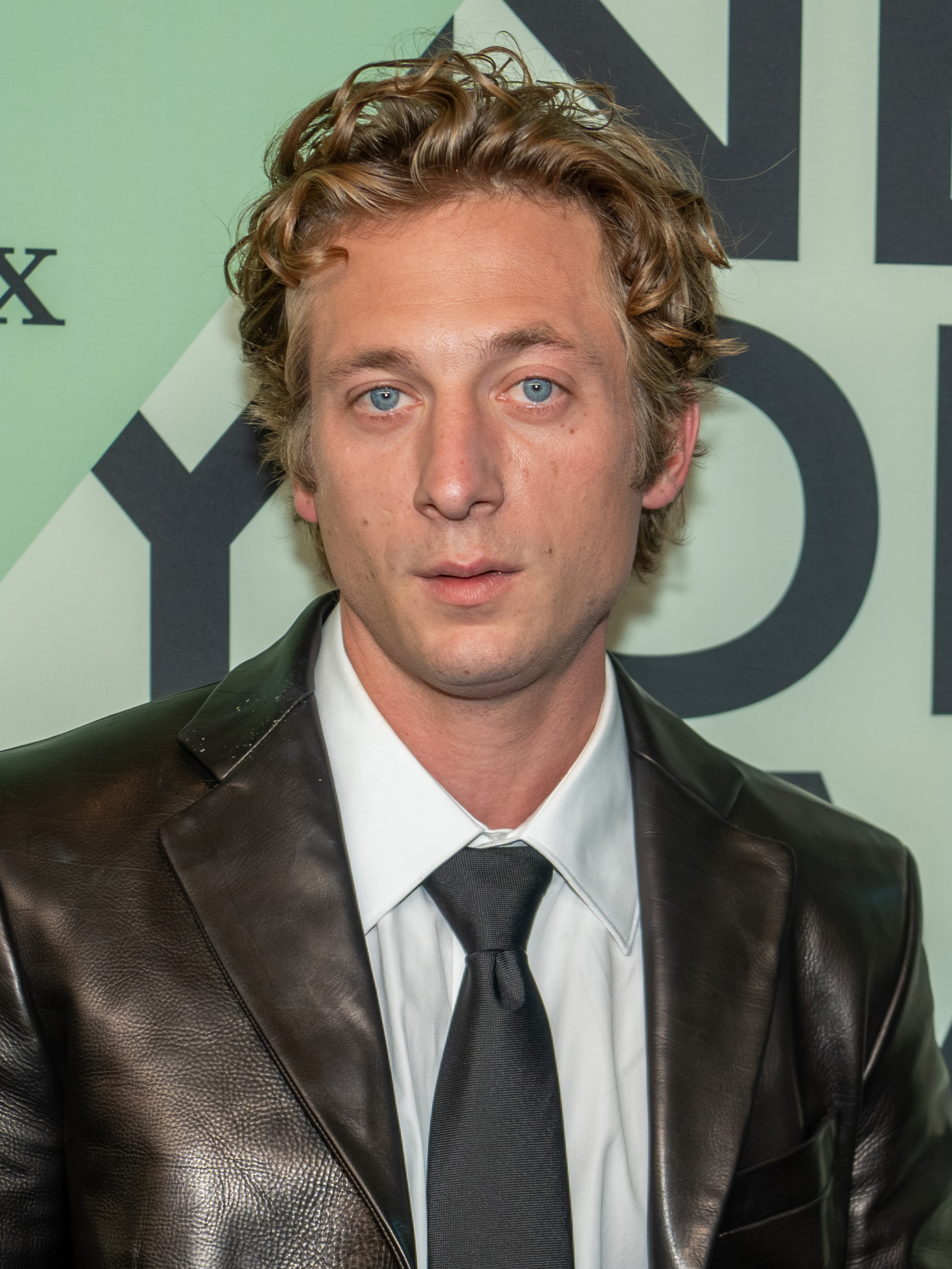
The Jeremy Allen White contest in Chicago featured over 50 contestants

- Two Jeremy Allen White contests took place on November 17; one in Chicago and one in Washington Square Park in New York.
  - The Chicago contest featured over 50 contestants, many of which copied White's appearance in The Bear. Hundreds of spectators attended. 37-year-old mental health therapist Ben Shabad won, taking home $50 and a pack of cigarettes.
  - The New York contest, in front of the Washington Square Arch, gathered at least 7 contestants and a relatively light crowd. Its organizer failed to appear, so a crowd member improvised the votes and found a cigarette from the audience for the winner, 28-year-old Andrew Hadad.
- A Zayn Malik contest in Maria Hernandez Park in Brooklyn on the same day was won by 29-year-old Shiv Patel, who received $50 cash or a free tattoo. 26-year-old Jaz Arnold, partly organized it for the chance to "find somebody cute", but later said that "a lot of [the contestants] honestly were either taken or gay, or had their girlfriends force them to enter." Online commentators said the finalists did not look like Malik, though contestants received thousands of new followers on social media,
- A Zendaya contest on November 20, was held during a bomb cyclone at Wilma Chan Park in Oakland, California, less than a mile from where Zendaya attended Oakland School for the Arts. It was also organized through Partiful, and mutual aid was collected during the event for organizations including Food Not Bombs and Friends of the Congo. Around 50 fans attended and seven people competed, with two of them being willing to dance to Zendaya's song "Replay". Zainab Bansfield won, and received prizes including $40, shampoo and conditioner, and chocolates. It was the first of these viral contests to feature a woman as its subject.
- Another Paul Mescal contest was held on November 21 in the Howl at the Moon pub in Hoxton, London, which offered free mullet haircuts and tattoos. Contestants were asked to saying a line in an Irish accent, 'split the G' on a pint of Guinness and measure the length of their shorts. Prizes for the winner, Connor Ryan, were a £20 Lidl voucher and the opportunity to turn on the pub's Christmas lights.
- A Jacob Elordi contest on November 23 on the lawn of the State Library of Victoria in Melbourne, Australia was attended by around 24 spectators and initially no contestants, leaving organizers to search the park for possible contestants. A man named Maxie, who had been found on a bench, won the $50 prize.
- A Gordon Ramsay contest was held at a Hell's Kitchen location in Caesars Palace in Las Vegas at 1 pm on November 23. Ramsay responded to the contest by saying "you've got to be kidding me". A man named Keith White was crowned winner by Ramsay himself; White took home a HexClad "Everything But The Kitchen Sink Bundle" worth $2,799 as well as a HexClad "8” Hybrid Pan" signed by Ramsay.
- A Tommy Shelby contest also took place outside the Bull Ring in Birmingham city centre on November 23, with a £500 shopping spree as a prize. Shelby is a fictional character played by Cillian Murphy in the TV show Peaky Blinders. 66-year-old Derek Brennan was named the winner through applause and judges' opinions.
- A Jungkook contest was held on 24 November in Ping Tom Park in Chicago. Jungkook is a member of South Korean boy band BTS. YouTuber Andrew Alexander won and received a bottle of soju and $20.
- A Glen Powell contest took place on November 24 at Auditorium Shores park in Powell's hometown of Austin, Texas. It was organized by a University of Texas at Austin grad student. Powell appeared in a video message for the event and announced that a family member of the winner would receive a cameo appearance in his next movie, which he said would be "a cash-value prize of $6 billion." Nearly 20 men competed, and were judged by Powell's mother and aunt. Max Braunstein, who had dressed as Powell's character in Top Gun: Maverick, won. As well as the cameo, he won a black cowboy hat, a medal, and a year's supply of Torchy's Tacos, and Powell called to congratulate him. In January 2025, Powell met Braunstein at the 82nd Golden Globe Awards and walked the red carpet with Chalamet contest winner Mitchell.
- A Shrek contest was held on the weekend of November 23 in Los Angeles' Echo Park by content creator Ka5sh, who had previously established the travelling Shrek Rave event. Contestants painted themselves with green face paint and wore tunics and ogre ears.

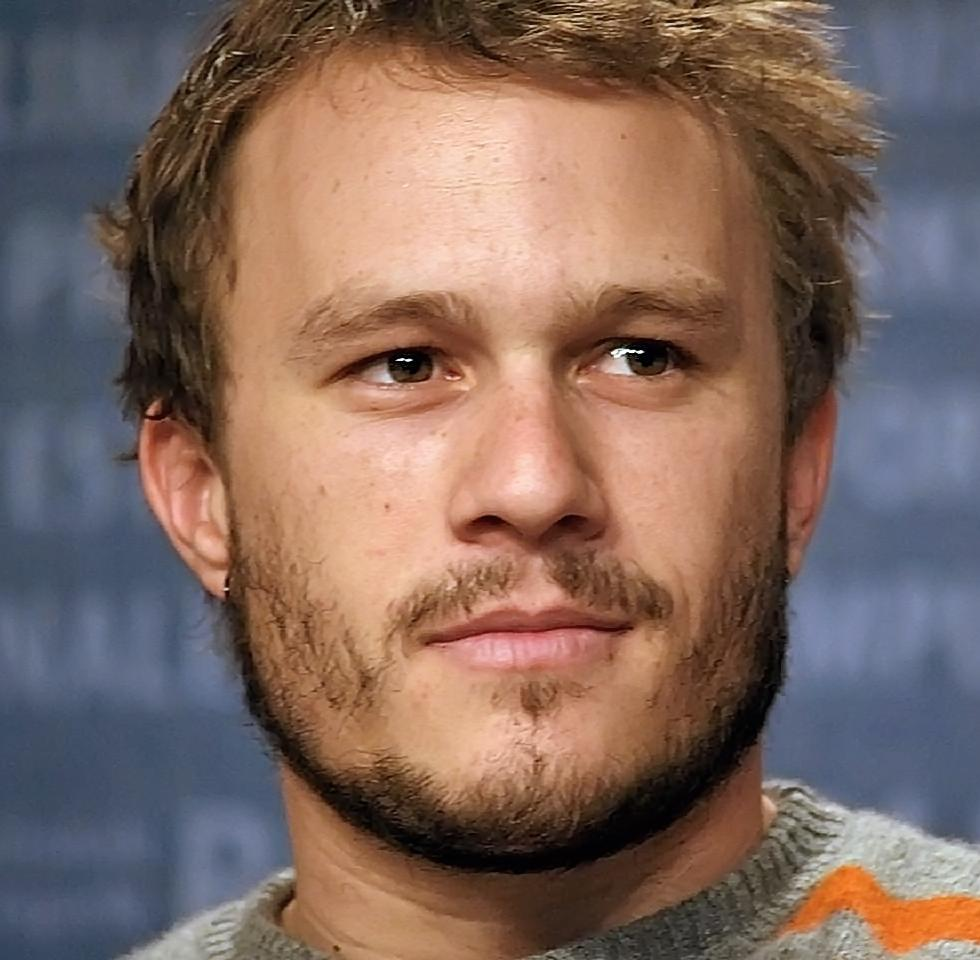
The Melbourne Heath Ledger contest was rare as a contest for a deceased celebrity

- A Heath Ledger contest on the same weekend was held in Camperdown Park in Sydney, which attracted a relatively large crowd compared to the Melbourne event. Contestants were judged on their impersonations of Ledger's lines, as well as their singing abilities, and they were additionally judged in "look moody holding film camera", "joker beatboxing", and "whose beer is the coldest" rounds. A $51 prize was given to winner Jude Bailey.
- An Art Donaldson and Patrick Zweig contest, for characters from the 2024 film Challengers played by Mike Faist and Josh O’Connor, was held on November 24 at the Westwood Park tennis courts in Los Angeles. One of its winners was a passerby who was persuaded to compete.
- A "Black Heartthrob Look-Alike Competition", for look-alikes of various black celebrities, was held in Herbert Von King Park in Bedford Stuyvesant, Brooklyn on November 24. It was intended to address the lack of black representation in the contests. Contestants attempted the contest as celebrities such as Skepta and Marvin Gaye. 31-year-old Shaken Grohmann won $50 and a pair of Adidas shoes for looking like Jayson Tatum.
- A Shohei Ohtani contest, for the Los Angeles Dodgers baseball player, was hosted by the Japanese American National Museum in Little Tokyo, Los Angeles on November 24. It was intended to celebrate the museum's new baseball exhibit. Joseph Ma won by an audience vote, winning a prize from the museum's gift shop and $17, which corresponded to Ohtani's jersey number.

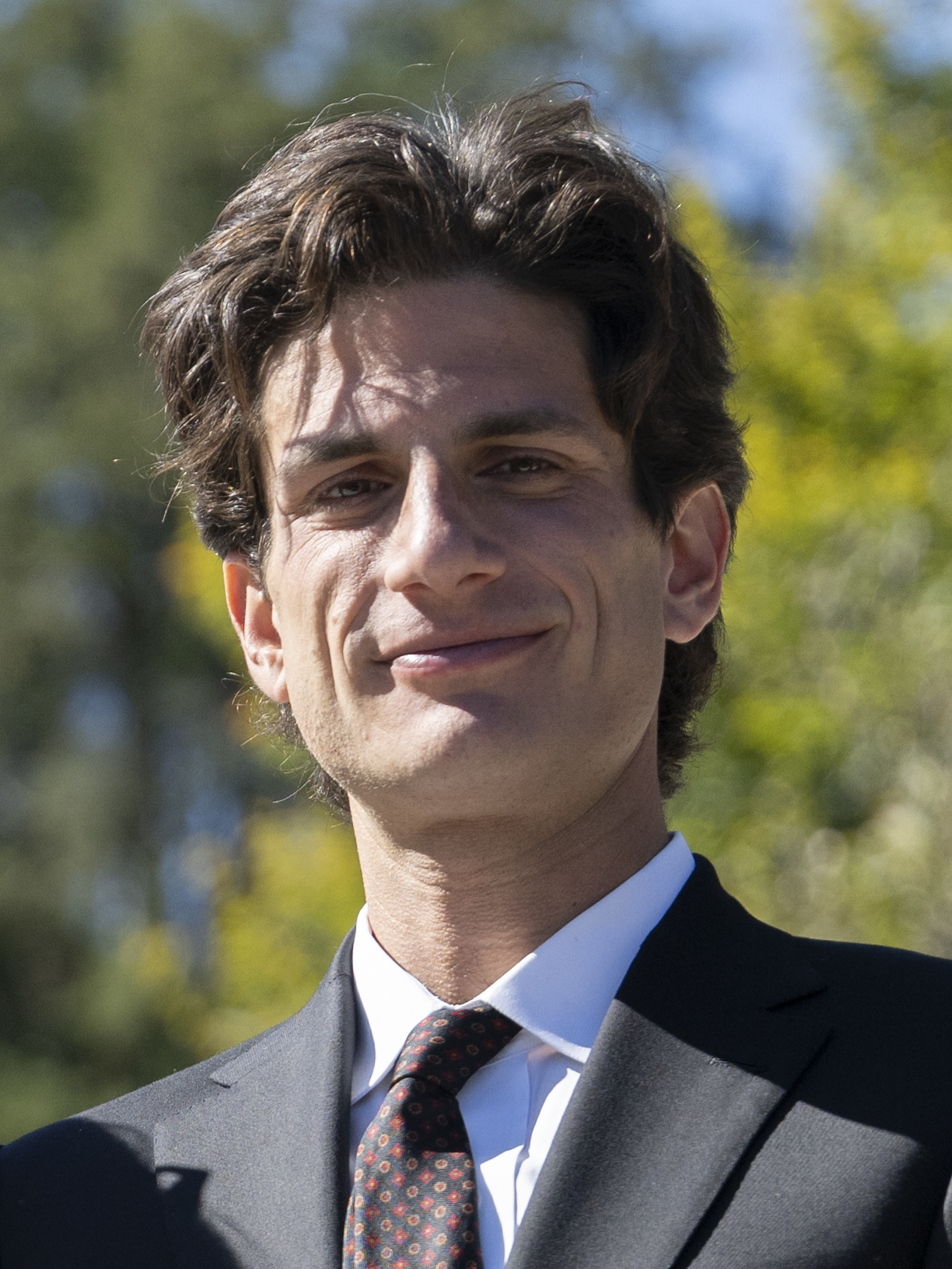
The Jack Schlossberg contest was unusual as it was held for a political figure

- A Jack Schlossberg contest gathered at Meridian Hill Park in Washington, D.C., on the afternoon of November 24; Schlossberg is the only grandson of former president John F. Kennedy. A total of 1,200 individuals had indicated their intention to attend the event, resulting in approximately 200 spectators. The initial 14 contestants were whittled down to 7 and then to 4 by acclamation, with the contestants who received the most applause moving to the next round, largely answering trivia questions about Schlossberg. 25-year-old Daniel Bonomo won the contest, receiving $50 in cash, a $100 one-year membership to Zipcar, and a $100 gift card for Salazar Restaurant. Co-organizer Ruchika Sharma said she hoped the event brought "a little levity in D.C. right now," following the election of Donald Trump.
- A Miles Teller contest took place in Rittenhouse Square on November 24 following the Philadelphia Marathon, drawing 22 contestants after being advertised on social media including Reddit. 19-year-old Pennsylvania State University student Henry Luce won and received a cheesesteak from Angelo's Pizzeria South Philly.
- A Tom Holland contest was held on Boston Common on November 25. While Holland had been seen in Boston in the previous few days, he did not appear. 26-year-old Nick Anderson won, receiving $50 and a bag of British candy.
- A Nacho Libre contest, for the character played by Jack Black in the 2006 film of the same name, was held at Produce Goods in downtown Corpus Christi, Texas on November 29. There were three competitors including a 2-year-old, drawing a crowd of 50 people. 32-year-old Ryan Garza won $50 in cash, and the two runners-up took home items from the store.

==== December ====
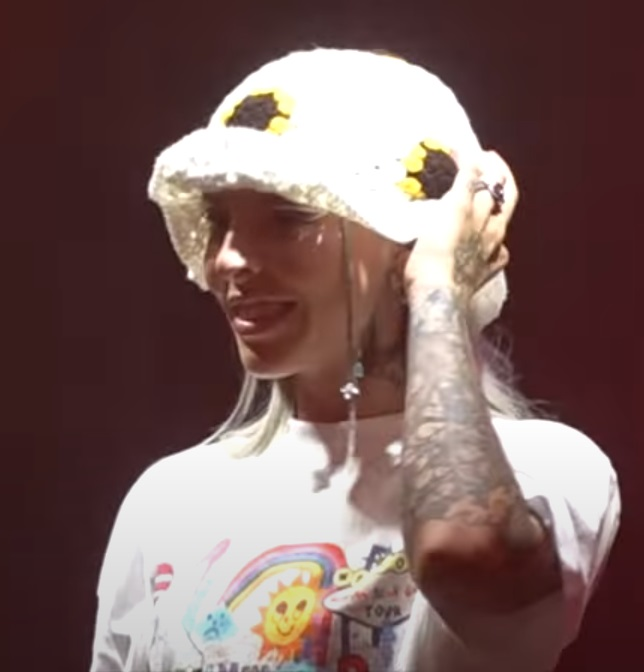
Contests for Young Miko and Zendaya were rare examples of contests about women

- A Young Miko contest was hosted on December 4 by monthly residency party Preciosita at The Virgil in Los Angeles. 27-year-old Daelyn Daniloff won by a unanimous vote, receiving $20, a trophy and a vibrator as prizes.
- A Rocky Balboa and Adrian Pennino contest took place on December 6 at the first annual RockyFest celebration in the University of Pennsylvania's ice rink arena, intended to replicate the characters' date scene in Rocky. Jason Carrion and Roxanne Carrion won a dinner at Victor Café, a hotel stay and a $250 certificate for a Rocky-themed gift shop.
- A Boq contest, for the fictional character in the 2024 film Wicked portrayed by Ethan Slater, was held in Washington Square Park on December 7. It was organized by TikTok user Molly Brown, who became known for expressing her dislike of the character.

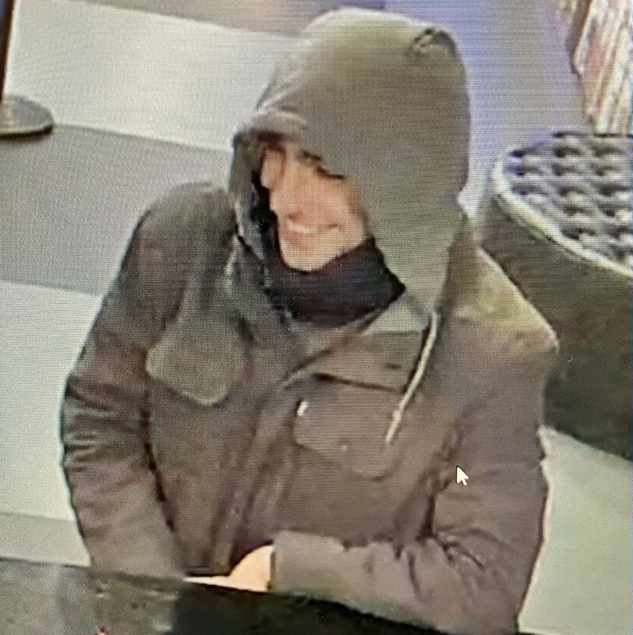
A contest was held for the suspect in the killing of Brian Thompson, based on CCTV images of him

- A contest for the suspect in the killing of UnitedHealthcare CEO Brian Thompson, later found to be Luigi Mangione, was held on December 7 in Washington Square Park, based on photos of the suspect which had been released by the New York City Police Department. Mangione was seen by some on social media as a folk hero. Around 6 men competed, drawing an audience of around 30 people who had seen fliers about the event posted on social media. One contestant wore a shirt that read "deny, defend, depose" words which had been found on ammunition at the murder scene. The anonymous winner of the contest, a 39-year-old who does data entry for a labor union, stated that he celebrated the gunman's actions, that it was important to get people to understand how people were hurting under the health care system, and that he planned to give half of the cash prize to Palestinian relief.
- A John F. Kennedy contest gathered on Boston Common on December 8; Michael John Gross won the $50 prize.

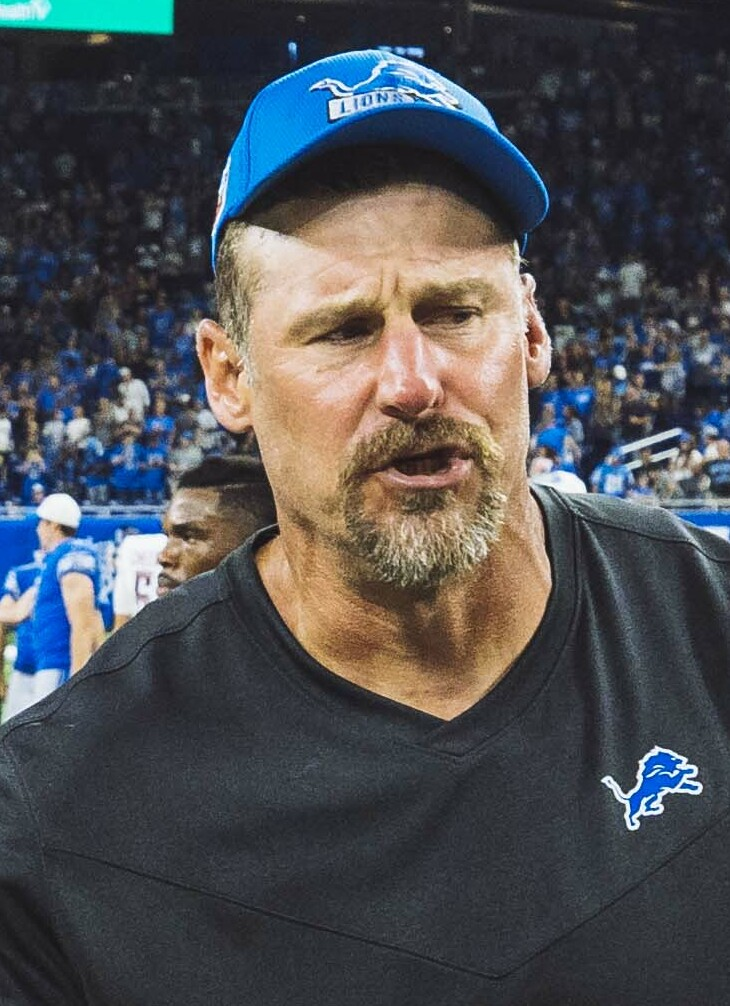
A Dan Campbell contest was held in a Detroit HopCat restaurant

- A Dan Campbell contest, for the head coach of the Detroit Lions, took place in a HopCat in Metro Detroit on December 8 after it was advertised with fliers. It drew 22 contestants. Four randomly selected judges scored the contestants from 1 to 10 in four categories: resemblance, style, energy and creativity. The five contestants who reached the final were then asked questions by the judges and the winner was decided by applause. It was won by 55-year-old machinist Jeff Randall, who received free Cosmik Fries at the restaurant for a year as well as a golden game ball, a reference to Campbell's tradition of giving balls to the best performers of the week. In a press conference, Campbell responded to the fliers, stating that "I don't know why you'd waste your time with that," and that "there's got to be better things to do unless the prize is something worth having. Is there a legitimate prize to it? Maybe I'll get in it." He did not appear at the contest.
- A Noah Kahan contest was held by the University of Vermont's program board on the green of its Dudley H. Davis Center on December 11. It drew a crowd of 150 to 200 people and 16 contestants of varying ages and genders, some of whom had painted-on beards. 28-year-old winner Sam Spanierman was noted for his particularly strong resemblance to Kahan, and received a vinyl copy of Kahan's album Stick Season.
- A Mark contest, for the rapper of South Korean boyband NCT, was held in Washington Square Park at 1:27 pm on December 13. Mark made a surprise arrival at the contest, though he was mobbed by fans and forced to leave early.
- A contest held for fictional character Gojo Satoru occurred during December 13 at Washington Square Park. It drew in a crowd of over 400. While the organizer was fined for not having the correct permit, the fine was subsequently paid for by the English voice actors of the show.
- Another contest for Mangione was held at the University of Florida's Plaza of the Americas on December 13, attended by hundreds of people. Prizes included a Nerf gun for first place, a date with the organizers for second place and a $5 McDonald's gift card for third. Cookies and candy were handed out to attendees. Some contestants made use of their time to speak about the killing and its wider context. An unnamed 21-year-old psychology senior, who had brought a Happy Meal as a prop, won.
- A Bernie Sanders contest gathered eight contestants in Burlington, Vermont, on December 14. Organiser Mike Trioli said that he held the contest because "we should celebrate someone not so much a celebrity in the world at a time like this", and that "Bernie's a unifier". One contestant replicated Sanders' outfit at the inauguration of Joe Biden. Miss Vermont 2024 Meera Seery, who had worked as a digital producer for Sanders, selected the first, second and third place winners. John Bronstein won and was given $17, which is Sanders' proposed federal minimum wage.

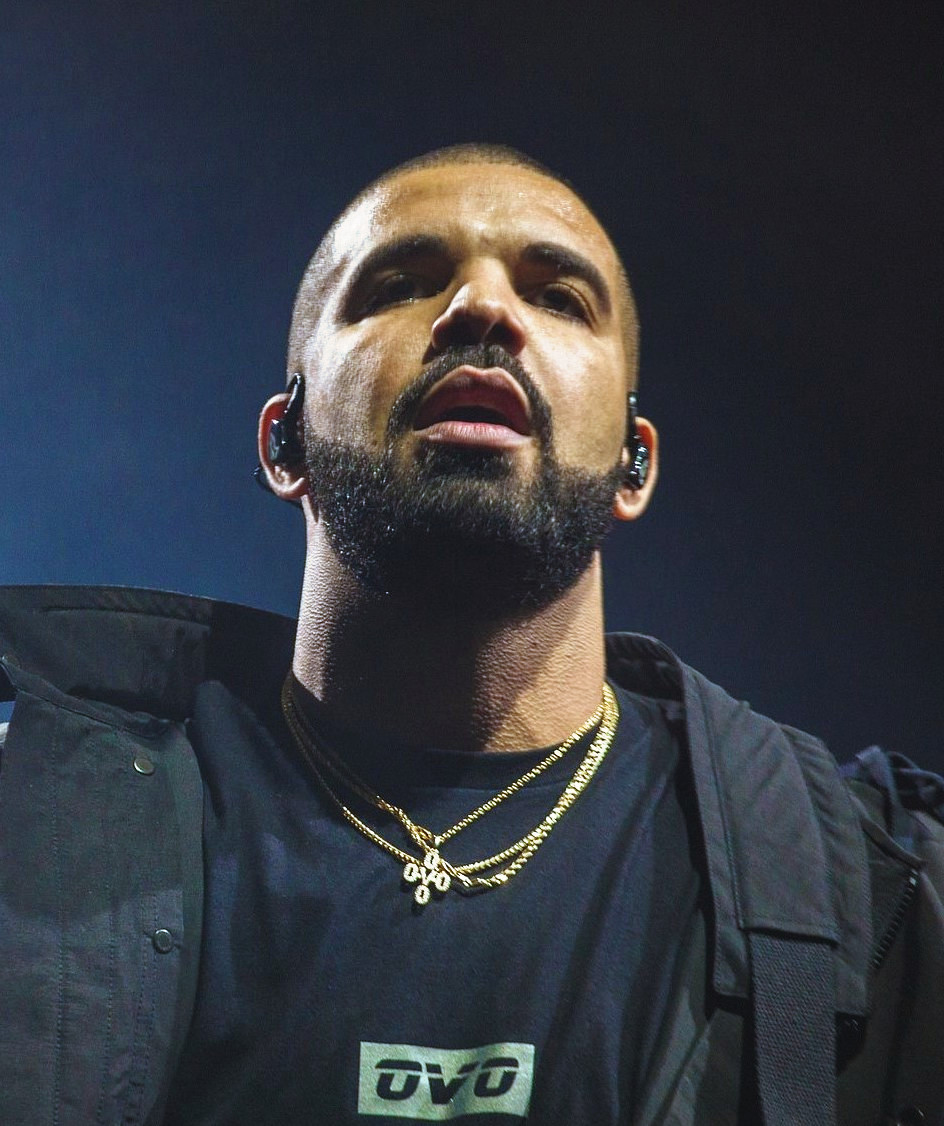
Drake contributed $10,000 to his own look-alike contest

- A Drake contest took place on December 14 at Casuals Cakery in Toronto. Prior to the contest, Drake himself direct messaged the cakery on Instagram that he was "adding 10 bands to the look-alike contest as the main prize." Contestants arrived as different versions of Drake, such as "Ozempic Drake," "Denim Drake" and "Boston Drake." Anthony Po appeared at the competition dressed as Drake's son Adonis, though the real Drake did not appear. Makayla Chambers, nicknamed "Girl Drake", won the $10,000.
- A Jason Kelce contest, for the retired Philadelphia Eagles footballer, was also held on December 14, at Rittenhouse Square in Philadelphia. Contestant Paul Crossley won after bringing a case of Kelce's Garage Beer, receiving Bird Gang liquor for the victory.
- An Abhay Deol contest, for the Bollywood actor, took place on December 15 in Hauz Khas Park in Delhi, India, organised by the owner of Instagram account Films From Underground. Prizes for the winner were ₹500, three cinema tickets and two packets of chewing gum. One contestant emulated Deol's thirst traps from Instagram by wearing a black wifebeater vest, and another came with a black eye, referencing a viral Deol moment. The winner wore a yellow sweater and a messy mullet.
- A Jalen Hurts contest, for another Eagles player, also took place in Rittenhouse Square on December 15, prior to a game against the Pittsburgh Steelers. 29-year-old Quaeleb Monfiston won and was awarded a free year of coffee at Dunkin'.
- A Jimmy O. Yang contest was held near the junction of Spring Street and College Street in Los Angeles on December 15. Yang himself competed, though came third in his own contest, possibly because he was not wearing glasses as he was on the flyer. The contest's winner received $50.
- A Joe Burrow contest, for the quarterback of the Cincinnati Bengals, was held on December 21 at Fountain Square in Cincinnati.

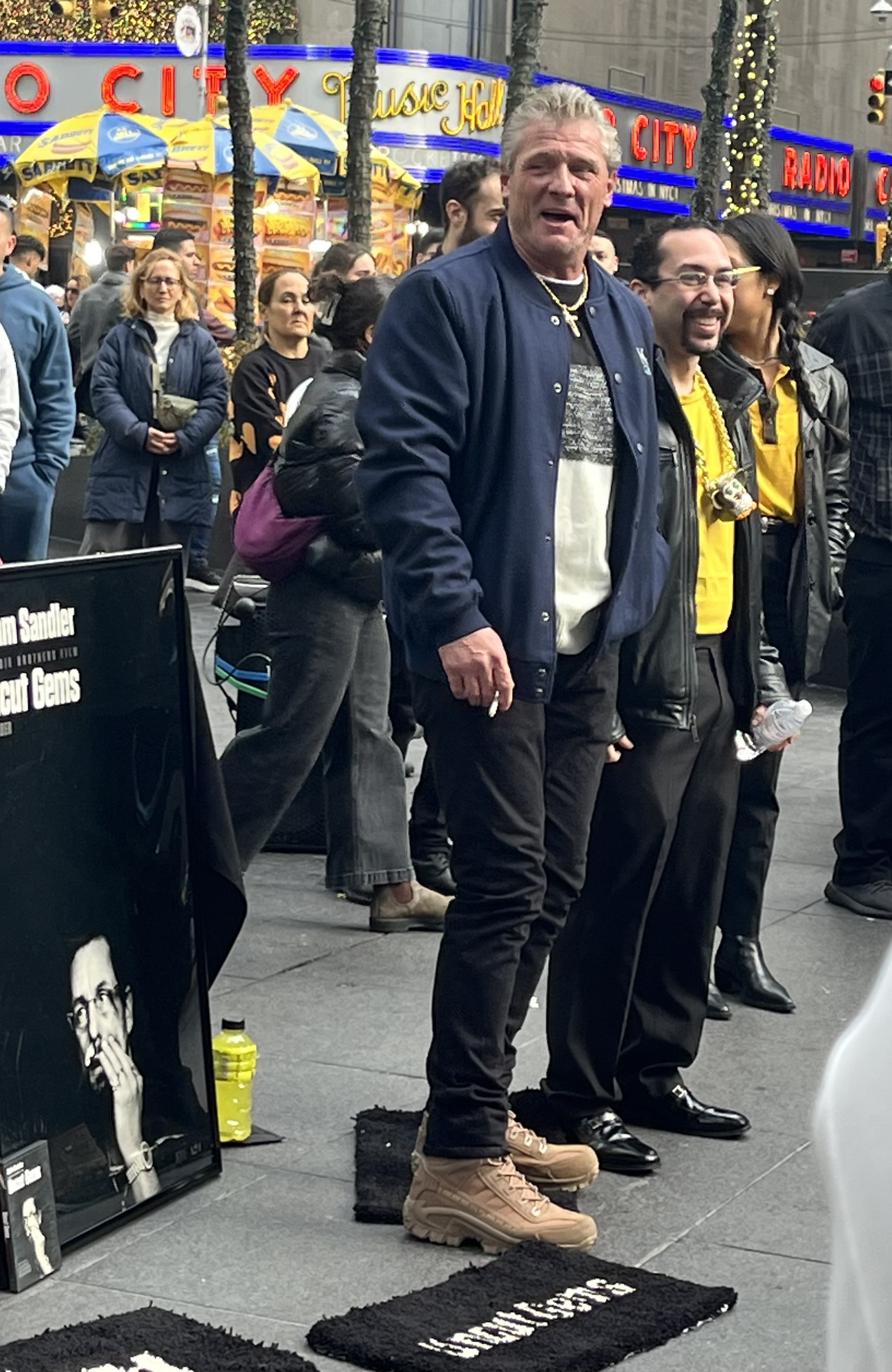
Keith William Richards and Wayne Diamond made guest appearances at the contest for Uncut Gems character Howard Ratner

=== 2025 ===
==== June ====
- A Pedro Pascal look-alike contest was held near the Lower East Side, New York restaurant Son del North, in reaction to Pascal's comments that "there's no good Mexican food in New York". Pascal did not show up. The winner was George Gountas, a lighting designer for The Daily Show, who received $50 and a year's supply of discounted burritos.

=== 2026 ===
==== September ====
- Another Jacob Elordi contest was held at the University of Bristol in England on September 24. A 17-year-old girl won.

==== October ====
- Following the release of the documentary You Can See Everything by director Lance Oppenheim, look-alike competitions took place in Washington Square Park, New York. Contestants could either enter as look-alikes for the movie subject Elizabeth Holmes or the filmmaker Nathan Fielder.

==== November ====
- A You Can See Everything themed competition was held on November 1 in Sydney, Australia.
- In Lafayette Park in San Francisco, a You Can See Everything themed competition is also set to take place on November 7th.
- Another You Can See Everything themed competition is due to take place on the 17th of November in Toronto, Canada. Contestants will be asked to perform business pitches and Lana Del Rey karaoke. Actors Andrew Phung, and Hannah Spear will co-host and judge.

== Responses and analysis ==
Anthony Po responded to the contests following his own, stating to Rolling Stone that "The election is behind us now, but everything really sucked, so to have something slightly interesting and fun, wholesome, and full of whimsy, was comforting. Every in-person thing costs money or it's too serious. Community is also something that you can find online but it's so different. People just want to be together in person and do something dumb. And this is a very low-barrier-to-entry way to do that." After several contests had taken place, a trend formed online in which users comically announced that new look-alike contests were to be held in their own bedrooms.

=== Analysis of popularity ===
British sociologist and cultural critic Ellis Cashmore commented to CNN that the rise in this type of contest "capture[d] something that we believe in the 21st century... That biology isn't destiny,” and that "humanity isn't fixed.” He also noted that the contests were a way to build community and "provide[d] us with an opportunity to relate and form new relationships with people we might hitherto not know and would never cross paths with". On social media, users came to a consensus that the contests were positive due to their ability to bring people out of their houses and into "third spaces" to form community. This was echoed by New York University digital culture expert Zari Taylor, who stated that "we really don't have a lot of third spaces left," that people craved "a shared purpose", also noting that there was a "balance between it being an in-person event and also knowing you'll see it online later." Alice Leppert, assistant professor of media and communications at Ursinus College, described the contests as "low-stakes environments where you can just go and you can observe, if you want to just observe, or you can be more involved". She additionally pointed out the "grassroots origins" of the contests which contrasts with the traditional organization of this type of event by publicity agents, magazines or film studios.

The events also received some commentary in relation to the presidential election on 6 November, which occurred after the Chalamet contest but before the other contests. Kaitlyn Tiffany of The Atlantic wrote that reason for the contests could be that they were "small reassurance that cities, many of which shifted dramatically rightward in the recent presidential election, are still the places that we want to believe they are—the closest approximation of America's utopian experiment, where people of all different origins and experiences live together in relative peace and harmony and, importantly, good fun." Playwright Jeremy O. Harris wrote on Twitter that the contests were "Great Depression era coded".

Historian and folklorist Matthew Algeo concurred that they were a result of people "looking for new and interesting forms of entertainment", as a result of "a psychological event" for which there was "a hunger for diversion". Raven Smith of Vogue included the contests, as well as recent films Dune, Gladiator II, and Wicked, in his assessment that "culturally, everything is a remake", and that "in some way, we all want the world to look like the world we already know". Eva Wiseman noted that the contests "illustrate a modern obsession with similarity", and compared them to biopics that year about Amy Winehouse, Bob Dylan and Donald Trump as well as Catherine, Princess of Wales' altered photo controversy that year, also noting that "every one of the 10 highest grossing movies of 2024 has been a sequel".

=== Other commentary ===
Other commentators wrote of the contests' role in publicity, social media and dating culture, with Amanda Hess of The New York Times writing that "When photographic evidence of the events is posted online, the game transforms into an Erotic Photo Hunt, with onlookers zooming in on their favorite contestants and racing to identify them on social media."

Brooke Erin Duffy, a professor specializing in the creator economy and digital culture at Cornell University, noted the relevance of look-alike apps and TikTok filters that find celebrity matches to these events. She also described the events' focus on men rather than women in relation to "the histories of surveillance and scrutiny of women, celebrities and their bodies and physique", stating that the events were "upending that cultural norm in a really interesting way".

The first Luigi Mangione contest on December 7 prompted some outlets such as Vogue to declare that "celebrity look-alike competition season has reached its due end", and that "the look-alike competition trend has officially...died. It was fun while it lasted, but the jig is up when it all starts to feel a little tragic." The Guardian listed the later contests, which it described as "astroturfed", as something to "leave behind in 2024" on December 25, also referencing the Mangione contest as a reason.

== See also ==
- Hemingway Days
- Josh fight
- Storm Area 51
