= Eephus =

2024 film directed by Carson Lund

- Theatrical release poster
- Directed by: Carson Lund
- Screenplay by: Michael Basta; Nate Fisher; Carson Lund
- Produced by: Michael Basta; David Entin; Tyler Taormina; Michael Richter
- Starring: Keith William Richards; Frederick Wiseman; Cliff Blake; Ray Hryb; Bill "Spaceman" Lee
- Cinematography: Greg Tango
- Edited by: Carson Lund
- Music by: Carson Lund; Erik Lund
- Production companies: Omnes Films; Nord-Ouest Films; Through The Lens Entertainment; A Major Production
- Distributed by: Music Box Films
- Release dates: May 9, 2024 (Cannes); March 7, 2025 (United States)
- Running time: 98 minutes
- Countries: France; United States
- Language: English
- Box office: $1 million

Eephus is a 2024 sports film directed by Carson Lund, in his feature directing debut, and co-written with Michael Basta and Nate Fisher. Starring Keith William Richards in his first lead role, it follows the final game of an amateur New England baseball league before their stadium is demolished.

The film had its world premiere at the Directors' Fortnight section of the 77th Cannes Film Festival in May 9, 2024, where it competed for the Caméra d'Or. It received positive reviews, and was theatrically released in the United States by Music Box Films on March 7, 2025.

== Premise ==
In a small Massachusetts town in the 1990s, the Adler's Paint baseball team, led by Ed Mortanian, face the Riverdogs, led by Graham Morris, in one last game before their ballfield is demolished to make room for a new school.

== Cast ==
- Keith William Richards as Ed Mortanian
- Frederick Wiseman as Branch Moreland
- Cliff Blake as Franny
- Ray Hryb as Rich Cole
- Bill "Spaceman" Lee as Lee
- Stephen Radochia as Graham Morris
- David Pridemore as Troy Carnahan
- Keith Poulson as Derek Dicapua
- John R Smith Jnr. as John Faiella
- Pete Minkarah as Glen Murray
- Wayne Diamond as Al
- Theodore Bouloukos as Chuck Poleen
- Joe Castiglione as Mr. Mallinari
- Russell J. Gannon as Bill Belinda
- David Torres Jr. as Dilberto D. Torres
- Nate Fisher as Merritt Nettles
- Chris Goodwin as Garrett Furnivall
- Conner Marx as Cooper Bassett
- Brendan "Crash" Burt as Bobby Crompton
- Tim Taylor as Kevin Santucci
- Ethan Ward as Tim Bassett
- Jeff Saint Dic as Preston Red
- Patrick Garrigan as Logan Evans
- Ari Brisbon as Wilton Palacios
- Johnny Tirado as Adrian Costa
- Joe Penczak as Louis
- Paul Kandarian as Clark
- Isabelle Charlot as Melanie
- Lou Basta as Howie
- Timber Holmes as Linda Belinda
- Annie Tisdale as Julie Belinda

== Production ==
Eephus was filmed on location at Soldiers Field in Douglas, Massachusetts. While the film's story centers on this real-life baseball field, the plot concerning the demolition of the field and the construction of a school was fictional. Lund cited Goodbye, Dragon Inn as an influence on the film's story.

Lund co-wrote the screenplay for Eephus with Michael Basta and Nate Fisher. Due to his experience as a director of photography, Lund had hoped to serve as cinematographer on the film, but chose Greg Tango for the role when this proved impractical.

Eephus was co-produced by members of Chapo Trap House, a prominent left-wing podcast known for its political commentary. Two of its hosts, Will Menaker and Amber A'lee Frost, have voice acting roles in the film.

== Release ==
Eephus world-premiered on May 9, 2024, in the Director's Fortnight section of the 2024 Cannes Film Festival. The film also screened at Filmfest München on June 30, 2024, and was selected for the Meeting Point section of the 69th Valladolid International Film Festival.

The film made its North American premiere in the Main Slate of the 62nd New York Film Festival on October 2, 2024. It also screened at AFI Fest on October 25, 2024. It was released in the United States on March 7, 2025.

== Reception ==
=== Critical reception ===
On the review aggregator website Rotten Tomatoes, 100% of 89 critics' reviews are positive, with an average rating of 8.1/10. The website's consensus reads: "Revealing character through the rules of the game, Eephus is a bittersweet baseball outing thrown at a perfect pitch." Metacritic, which uses a weighted average, assigned the film a score of 84 out of 100, based on 22 critics, indicating "universal acclaim".

In a review for IndieWire, critic Christian Zilko praised how Eephus approached social relationships between men. He lauded the filmmakers' choice to make a school the cause of the stadium's demolition, arguing this decision takes the focus off of a potential villain eroding social space and keeps the emphasis on the passage of time. Echoing these sentiments, Jessica Kiang of Variety characterized Eephus as an "adorably existential, off-kilter take on the sports movie".

=== Accolades ===
Award	Ceremony date	Category	Recipient	Result	Ref.
Cannes Film Festival	May 25, 2024	Camera d'Or	Eephus	Nominated	
Filmfest München	July 6, 2024	Cinevision Competition	Eephus	Nominated	
Silk Road International Film Festival	September 25, 2024	Best Screenplay	Michael Basta, Nate Fisher, Carson Lund	Won	
New Hampshire Film Festival	October 17, 2024	Best NH Narrative Feature	Eephus	Won	
Belfast Film Festival	November 8, 2024	Best Breakthrough Performance (Best Ensemble Cast)	Eephus	Won	
Gotham Independent Film Awards	December 1, 2025	Breakthrough Director	Carson Lund	Nominated	
Chicago Film Critics Association Awards	December 11, 2025	Milos Stehlik Award for Breakthrough Filmmaker	Carson Lund	Nominated	
St. Louis Film Critics Association Awards	December 14, 2025	Best First Feature	Eephus	Nominated	
Austin Film Critics Association Awards	December 18, 2025	Best First Film	Eephus	Nominated	
Seattle Film Critics Society Awards	December 15, 2025	Best Ensemble	Eephus	Nominated	
New York Film Critics Circle Awards	January 6, 2025	Best First Feature	Eephus	Won	
Film Independent Spirit Awards	February 15, 2026	John Cassavetes Award	Carson Lund, Michael Basta, Nate Fisher, Tyler Taormina, David Entin	Nominated	
Film Independent Spirit Awards	February 15, 2026	Best Editing	Carson Lund	Nominated	
Toronto Film Critics Association Awards	March 2, 2026	Best First Feature	Eephus	Nominated	

== See also ==
- Eephus pitch, the baseball pitch from which the film takes its name
- List of baseball films
