= Anthony Potero =

American internet personality

- Born: July 30, 2001 (age 25)
- Other names: Anthony Po, Anthpo
- Education: Rutgers University–New Brunswick
- Occupation: Social media influencer
- Known for: Timothée Chalamet look-alike contest, Cheeseball Man, Kid with Crocs, Bunch of Friends, dancing in a Perry the Platypus costume

YouTube information
- Channel: Anthony Po
- Subscribers: 2.01 million
- Views: 296 million
- Last updated: July 28 2026
- Website: anthonypo.com

Anthony Potero (born July 30, 2001), also known as Anthony Po and as his online alias Anthpo, is an American content creator and social media influencer, known for his various viral stunts and characters including his hosting of the Timothée Chalamet look-alike contest and the characters Cheeseball Man and Kid with Crocs. In 2025, he co-founded the creative marketing company Pufferfish, where he also serves as chief creative officer.

== Early life ==
Potero grew up outside of Philadelphia in Swedesboro, New Jersey. He has described himself as a "very online child", and said he was given little supervision on the internet. At 10 years old, he began posting Minecraft videos to YouTube. He began creating social media content at the Gloucester County Institute of Technology high school, and posted a video of himself playing video games each day to YouTube during his freshman year. He additionally joined a sketch comedy group and began making his own videos as a freshman, such as "Disturbing students as Perry the Platypus," which were successful. A year later, he began 1 Minute Talk Show, a rapid-fire interview show that he started at the high school alongside Aiden Wall. This was created in the school's film studio, and gained 250,000 Instagram followers.

Potero's relationship with Wall soured, and Potero transferred to Kingsway Regional High School for his senior year, starting his own YouTube channel; he has said this was "out of spite" and has since called Wall his bully. Wall continued to host 1 Minute Talk Show. In 2019, Potero and Wall repaired their friendship. In 2020 at 19 years old, Potero moved to Las Vegas to join The House Nobody Asked For, a "collab" house of eight influencers with 2.6 million followers on TikTok.

Potero studied marketing and business analytics at Rutgers Business School in Rutgers University–New Brunswick; he has said it "did not help [him] professionally, but gave me a lot of good memories and fun times." He spent most of his time at university shooting and editing videos or fielding advertising deals. In one such video, he began a K-pop group known as OKPop with his friends, only one of whom was Korean. Potero graduated from Rutgers in 2023, though made videos counting down the days until the end of college, gaining $65,000 in ad revenue for the month of May which was the most he had ever earned on YouTube.

== Career ==
After graduation, Potero moved into a house of other creators. By December 2023, OKPop had earned $11,000 in music streams and $8,500 in merchandise sales, and Potero was earning $17,030 per month. He had his own team with seven interns and seven contractors. Jimmy "MrBeast" Donaldson recruited him; Potero worked with Donaldson's company's short-form video content team in Greenville, North Carolina for four months in 2023, meeting Talia Schulhof while doing so. During this, Potero stopped making content for YouTube and social media for a period. He has stated that he proposed the idea for the Timothée Chalamet look-alike contest to Donaldson and that this was rejected. After leaving MrBeast, Potero revived his social media channels.

=== 2024–26: Viral stunts ===
In early 2024, while operating for weeks from an Airbnb house in Florida, Potero seized on existing false claims that aliens had been spotted along Bayside Marketplace in Miami, Florida, and that police had appeared to block off the area. He used fake accounts to flood social media with comments after the fact that claimed to have witnessed the aliens. He was aided by friends in doing this, and hired a Pedro Pascal impersonator for the task. He spent around $7,000 on a large alien head, CGI, and a video from Star Trek II actress Laura Banks to stage alien sightings.

In April 2024, Potero advertised an event in Manhattan’s Union Square in which he, wearing a bright orange ski mask and cape to disguise himself as a character named Cheeseball Man, consumed a large jar of cheese ball puffs. The video reached 2.2 million views by March 2025. Potero credited Alexander Tominsky, who had played the character of Chicken Man and had eaten 40 consecutive chickens per day, with the 40th being eaten in front of a crowd on an abandoned pier in South Philadelphia two years prior, for the idea. However in December, Tominsky responded negatively and challenged Potero to a fight, which Potero did not accept.

In late 2024, Potero was based in Jersey City, New Jersey, and had been making content for eight years. In September, Potero hired a 'flyer guy' to put up a number of posters around New York City, advertising a Timothée Chalamet look-alike contest at Washington Square Park on October 27, with a $50 cash prize. He has stated he chose Chalamet because he had himself been described as a "less hot Timothée Chalamet". He put up an invite on Partiful for the event, drawing thousands of RSVPs as well as sponsorship of the event by Partiful itself. A day prior on October 26, Potero hosted a smaller look-alike contest of livestreamer Kai Cenat. At the Chalamet contest the next day, several hundred people attended. Potero dressed himself like Charlie Chaplin and rode into the event on a penny-farthing bicycle. Look-alike Miles Mitchell, who was dressed as Chalamet's Willy Wonka, won the event. Potero was fined $500 for the unauthorized event. Potero was aided by three personal assistants, including his producer and assistant Paige. This contest started a chain of contests which continued without Potero, becoming an international trend of look-alike contests in 2024.

On January 25, 2025, Potero challenged his friend and later bully from high school Aiden Wall in a best-of-three Super Smash Bros. tournament at Columbus Circle in New York City. Wall drove two hours from South Jersey for the event, and Potero won. Potero posted a YouTube video about the event, gaining 570,000 views by 22 March. He was working out of the garage of a Jersey City rowhouse that he rented with friends. By March 2025, Potero had over 2.3 million followers across YouTube, Instagram, and TikTok.

On September 12, 2025, Potero, along with Hannah Bondalo (Hanbon), Coy Piso, and Will Mahony started the Bunch of Friends YouTube channel. Each video features the group vlogging different challenges, like hiking up a mountain to doomscroll, eating edibles before a HVAC convention, or eating a skateboard. During the channel's second season, they threatened to crush their robot baby doll, named Thanos, with an anvil unless Neal Mohan, YouTube's CEO, answered a question. They would not reveal what the question was until Mohan answered.

On May 16, 2026, Potero announced that he would no longer be producing content on his personal YouTube channel, citing the struggles he had experienced as a public figure. He instead announced that he would be focusing on collaborative content, as well as behind-the-camera work.

=== 2025–26: Marketing ventures ===
Potero began a brand partnership with footwear brand Crocs in 2025, pitching multiple ideas to the brand which he has said decided on "most complicated one". This plan was to put 3D printed Crocs on statues across New York City, as well as to go undercover, build a character and a narrative, launch a new social media account on Instagram and TikTok, and document the process. These videos gained millions of views and hundreds of thousands of followers, and following Potero's reveal that it was in fact him other brands became interested.

In summer 2025, prompted by success of the Kid with Crocs venture, Potero began working with Talia Schulhof to create a business. By November 2025, Potero had obtained 1.9 million subscribers on YouTube, and had a team of seven people behind this. Potero and Schulhof announced their creative marketing company Pufferfish that month, advertising its focus on viral stunts with an in-person and online cultural impact. They began with a team of four based in an office in Midtown and consisting of Potero as chief creative officer, Schulhof as chief executive officer, and two others including a strategic advisor, also making use of Potero's YouTube team. The company intends to target six-figure deals with bespoke campaigns. One of their first campaigns was a set of billboards around Manhattan, advertising the language learning app Airlearn.

In November 2025, it was announced by Potero and New York City-based visual artist Danny Cole that they would be creating Everybody’s Album, attempting to gain number 1 on the Billboard charts. They planned to do this by paying 100,000 people $7.99 via a digital wallet in exchange for submitting one second of any kind of audio to appear on the album. This $7.99 payment would then be spent on purchasing a pre-order of the album. Everybody's Album succeeded in engaging over 100,000 participants and was released on December 12, 2025. Meat computer, Daisy the Great, and Marjorie -W.C. Sinclair were included as features on the album's 22 normal songs, with its 23rd and final song, "Everybody", featuring all 100,000 second-long pieces of audio in succession. Though Cole stated that his team went to "extreme lengths" to remain compliant with Billboard's rules, the album was not included on the Billboard charts as it did not meet the company’s "eligibility criteria" for charting.
