= Benjamin De Almeida =

Canadian-American YouTuber (born 1999)

- De Almeida in 2026
- Born: Benjamin De Almeida; September 8, 1999 (age 27); Edmonton, Alberta
- Years active: 2013–present

TikTok information
- Page: Benjamin De Almeida
- Followers: 12.3 million

YouTube information
- Channel: BENOFTHEWEEK
- Genres: Comedy; vlog; challenge; prank
- Subscribers: 9.11 million (main channel); 927 thousand (Drama Mama)
- Views: 2.99 billion (main channel); 47.4 million (Drama Mama)
- Last updated: September 23, 2026
- Website: benoftheweek.com

Benjamin De Almeida (born September 8, 1999), also known as Benoftheweek (stylized in all caps), is a Canadian-American YouTuber and TikToker. He first went viral on TikTok in 2018, where he is known for his surreal, satirical storytelling skits emphasizing his offbeat personality. On YouTube, he mainly creates challenge and vlog content. All of his videos are self-produced and edited.

== Early life ==
Benjamin De Almeida was born on September 8, 1999, in Edmonton, Alberta. He is an only child. De Almeida admired YouTubers such as Shane Dawson and iJustine as a child and had always wanted to be a creator. He was inspired by the channels Filthy Frank and Cow Chop. With his parents' support, he dropped out of college to become a full-time influencer.

== Career ==
De Almeida began creating videos and uploading them to YouTube in a now-inactive channel he created in 2010; he created his current YouTube channel in 2013. He did not have many friends or hobbies at the time, so he spent most of his free time working on videos, many of which were Minecraft Let's Plays. De Almeida also originally posted short-form videos on Snapchat, but moved to TikTok in November 2018. He first went viral after posting a video noting his resemblance to actor Noah Centineo, reaching over two million followers in less than a year. He capitalized on the gap in comedy content during the early months of the platform, when it was filled with viral dance trends, by creatic comedic storytelling videos of his travels, such as his visit to North Korea. His YouTube channel videos consisted of content such as Omegle, prank calls, and "hacking" Zoom meetings, characterized with his frequent references to Internet memes and culture from the early 2010s. He went from 890,000 subscribers in the start of 2021 to 1.8 million in October of that year.

In February 2021, De Almeida launched the podcast I Almost Died, which detailed his near-death experiences and those of others. The premiere episode included De Almeida talking about a trip to Bali in which he drove a motorcycle into oncoming traffic and just avoided getting himself put in prison. The podcast ended in April 2022, but De Almeida launched the Drama Mama podcast in September of that year. He became a correspondent for Nick News in 2023 and judged Anthony Potero's viral Timothée Chalamet look-alike contest in 2024.

== Personal life ==
De Almeida has mysophobia and hypochondria, enjoys fashion, and is vegan. He grew up Catholic but became an atheist. He is an ambassador of the progressive advocacy organization Gen-Z for Change. In 2024, he organized a charity fortune-telling event in Los Angeles which benefited the Women's Reproductive Rights Assistance Project.

== Awards and nominations ==
Year	Award	Category	Result	Ref.
2022	Streamy Awards	Breakout Creator	Nominated	
2023	Streamy Awards	First Person	Nominated	
2023	Children's and Family Emmy Awards	Outstanding Host	Nominated	
