= Club Chalamet =

American social media fan account (born 1966)

- Born: Simone Cromer; September 30, 1966 (age 60)
- Occupation: Social media personality
- Years active: 2018–present

Instagram information
- Page: Club Chalamet
- Followers: 15.6K

X information
- Handle: @clubchalamet
- Display name: Club Chalamet
- Years active: 2018–present
- Followers: 49.2K
- Last updated: June 28, 2026

Club Chalamet is a fan account on both Twitter and Instagram for the American and French actor Timothée Chalamet run by Simone Cromer (born September 30, 1966). She created the Twitter account in 2018 after Chalamet's success in Call Me by Your Name (2017), as a space for older fans. She became viral in 2023 after several controversial comments she made about Chalamet's girlfriend, Kylie Jenner, which sparked discussions regarding parasocial relationships and Stan Twitter. Since then, her reaction to content involving the couple has become an internet meme.

Cromer is credited with helping to popularize the Timothée Chalamet look-alike contest of 2024. Since her virality in 2023, she has been referred to as a "micro-celebrity" and "Timothée Chalamet's most well-known stan" by varying publications, and has had a profile by The Wall Street Journal.

== Early and personal life ==
Simone Cromer was born on September 30, 1966, and grew up in Detroit, Michigan. She frequented drive-in movie theatres as a child with her family, which sparked an interest in film. She attended the Detroit College of Business at the campus in Warren, and graduated from the University of Michigan with a degree in psychology in 1996.

She lives in Los Angeles, California, as of 2025. She works in healthcare and is a part of Generation X. Her house in Altadena burned from the Eaton Fire in January 2025. Cromer is also a fan of Emma Stone, Connor Storrie, Rage Against the Machine, and Pearl Jam.

== Social media career ==
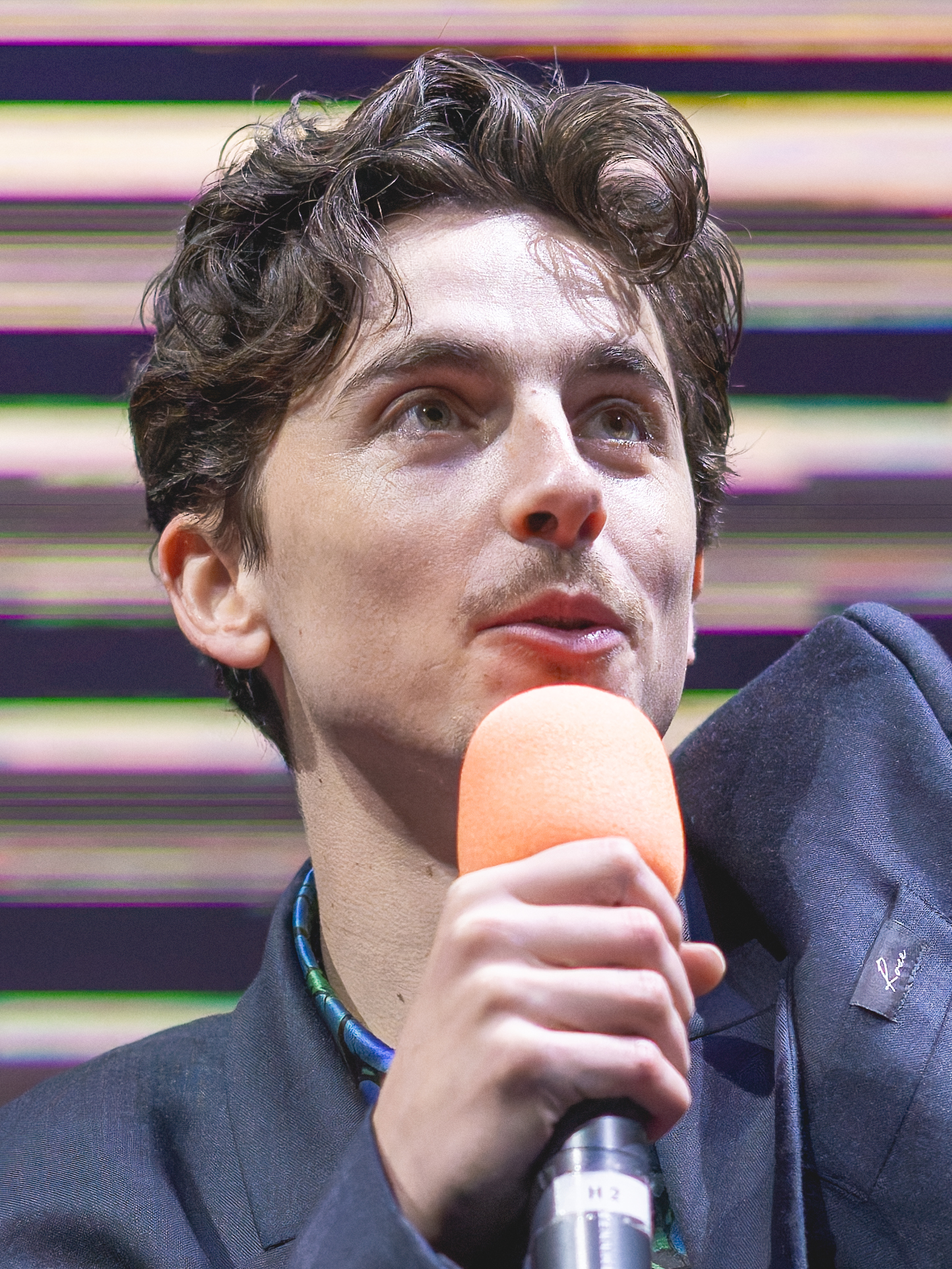
Club Chalamet is a fan account for the American actor Timothée Chalamet.

Club Chalamet is a fan account on Instagram and Twitter for actor Timothée Chalamet, run by a woman named Simone Cromer; she is also referred to as "Miss Club" by her fans. She posts updates on the actor.

Cromer became interested in film festivals after seeing Orlando Bloom at the premiere of Haven at the 2004 Toronto International Film Festival. After that, she became a frequent attendee of the film festival. She attended the 2004, 2005, and 2006 renditions. Also in 2006, she was a fan of the actor Brad Pitt and ran a blog called "Brangelina Fans". Cromer was also a fan of actor Michael Fassbender. She created the Club Chalamet Twitter account in 2018, following Chalamet's breakout role in Call Me by Your Name (2017). She has spoken out against judgement for being an older fan of Chalamet, being 29 years his senior, and started the account to provide a space for older fans and to focus on his artistic pursuits. Cromer considers herself a mild-mannered fan interested in Chalamet's career. To celebrate the American release of Beautiful Boy in 2018, Cromer organized a contest, with the prize being a ticket to a Q&A with Chalamet; the winner was a 19-year-old fan. She has met Chalamet during a Los Angeles premiere of Wonka (2023).

Cromer went viral in 2023 following her disapproval of Chalamet's relationship with the American celebrity Kylie Jenner. At the time, she had 5,000 followers on Twitter. In a 52-minute Twitter Spaces session, she suggested that Chalamet was blackmailed into a relationship with Jenner; the session became prominent for a comment by Cromer about the couple not being seen visiting Olive Garden, despite Chalamet liking Italian cuisine. Cromer was criticized for her opinions online, which had spurred discussions about parasocial relationships between celebrities and fans, and the unhealthy nature of Stan Twitter. Some commentators argued that her criticism of Jenner reflected a broader pattern in which female partners of male celebrities receive disproportionate scrutiny. Cromer later claimed the negative backlash was orchestrated by Jenner's family, the Kardashian family. Despite the negative attention, Cromer denies having an unhealthy infatuation with Chalamet, viewing him "as a nephew" and an artist.

Her reactions and criticism inspired an Internet meme of how she would react to developments of Jenner and Chalamet's relationship and his personal life, which was referenced by the American actress Rachel Zegler in May 2025. Following Vanity Fair posting an image of Chalamet and Jenner together and captioning it "Club Chalamet, our heart goes out to you", Cromer responded, saying "Hey, @VanityFair, I'm fine, I'm always here for Timothée. Always!"

Cromer is credited with popularizing the Timothée Chalamet look-alike contest of 2024. She incorrectly predicted that Chalamet would not attend due to security concerns and conflicting work schedules. Chalamet made an appearance at Washington Square Park and took pictures with several contestants. She took a brief hiatus from April to May 2025. Cromer advocates against ageism in Hollywood. She believes that major award bodies refuse to award men under 30 because of their youth, and has criticized SAG-AFTRA voters for voting against Chalamet due to his age.

In December 2025, Cromer was the subject of a profile by The Wall Street Journal. On January 20, 2026, Cromer created an Instagram fan account for Heated Rivalry's Connor Storrie, called "Storrie Times". The account was mass reported, and was suspended less than 24 hours later; Cromer claimed issues related to the verification of her identity led to the suspension. She later started a tumblr for Storrie called "Storrie Glorrie".

Following Chalamet's loss of Best Actor at the 98th Academy Awards, Yola Mzizi for The New York Times noted that Cromer's support of the actor "appeared to waver". In a personal essay following the ceremony, she said that wanted a break from covering Chalamet's Oscar campaign, adding that her efforts had not felt personally fulfilling. She has since focused on a fan account for Storrie.

In June 2026, Cromer allegedly got in a fight with another fan of Storrie's outside a hotel Storrie was staying in. Cromer claimed to be assaulted without provocation, while the fan claimed she "raced toward [Storrie]", following which they confronted Cromer, and an altercation ensued.

== Reception ==
Ruchira Sharma for Grazia described her as "Timothée Chalamet's most well-known stan", while Constance Grady for Vox called her "the internet's most prominent Chalamet fan". Olivia De Zilva for The Guardian referred to Cromer as an "integral part" of Stan Twitter, highlighting her intense loyalty and dedication to Chalamet as an uncommon phenomenon. Fran Hoepfner for Vulture criticized the "tame" speculation the account made. Ashley Wong for The Wall Street Journal said Cromer was "probably the most famous of Chalamet's fans". Following The Wall Street Journal's interview with Cromer, Ellie Muir for The Independent referred to her as a "micro-celebrity". Muir also described the online mockery of Cromer as possibly being rooted in ageism and misogynoir. Paper listed Club Chalamet's profile interview with The Wall Street Journal on their 2025 ranking of internet moments.
