= Stan Twitter =

Online community of Twitter users

Stan Twitter is a community of Twitter (X) users associated with fandoms around celebrities, music, TV shows, movies, and popular culture. Discussions in Stan Twitter spaces often revolve around public figures – primarily those in the entertainment industry. Members have a terminology and meme culture that is distinct from the rest of Twitter and is heavily associated with the LGBTQ+ community.

Stans have been characterized as fanatic and toxic in their support of their subject of interest. They have engaged in a number of harassment campaigns against people they consider to have wronged their subject of interest, including sending death threats.

== Background and description ==
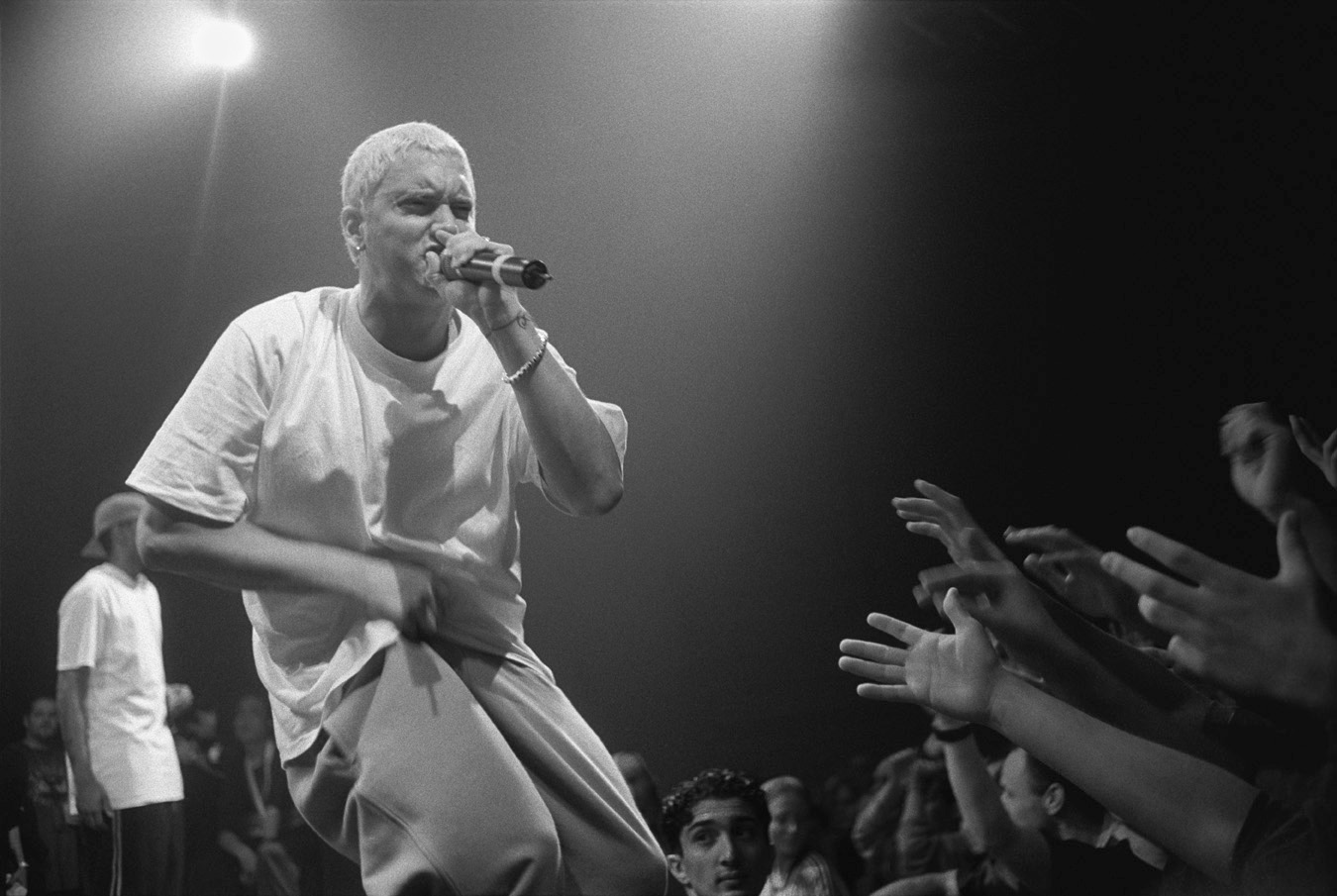
Rapper Eminem performing; his song "Stan" is often credited with the origin of the contemporary usage of the word stan.

The origin of the term stan is often credited to the 2000 song "Stan", about an obsessed fan, by American rapper Eminem featuring British singer Dido. The word itself was added to the Oxford English Dictionary in 2017 with the definition "an overzealous or obsessive fan of a particular celebrity". The term was originally a noun, but over time evolved and began to be used as a verb as well.

Stan Twitter has been noted by The Atlantic as one of the "tribes" of Twitter. Polygon has described Stan Twitter as "an overarching collection of various fandoms", and additionally as a community that "[signifies] individuals congregated around certain, specific interests ranging from queer identity to K-pop groups", and added that "Stan Twitter is essentially synonymous with fandom twitter."

The Daily Dot wrote that "Stan Twitter is essentially a community of Extremely Online like-minded individuals who discuss their various fandoms and what they 'stan'." Stan Twitter has also been noted for its common overlap with LGBTQ+ Twitter communities. The Guardian noted, for example, that "Gay male culture has always coalesced around female pop stars, from Judy Garland to Lady Gaga and Ariana Grande."

Mat Whitehead of HuffPost described stans as "volcanic", and added that they are "organised, ... dedicated and—at times—completely unhinged." Whitehead went on to describe stans of recording artists, writing "stans aren't just superfans, they're a community of like-minded souls coming together, unified under the banner of wanting to see their chosen celebrity flourish. Friendships are made, bonding over a shared love of an artist, their work, their achievements."

== Culture ==
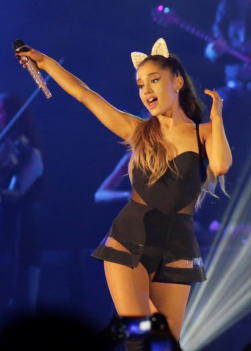
Singer Ariana Grande (pictured in 2015) has been noted as an example of an artist with a dedicated fanbase, being frequently mentioned in media articles about stan culture.

Stan Twitter has been noted for its extremely fanatic culture and behavior. Vanity Fair highlighted American pop singers Ariana Grande and Taylor Swift, as well as the K-pop group BTS as artists who have "extremely fanatic fanbases". Vanity Fair also credited those fanbases and "stan culture and its associated engines" with helping propel the popularity of music videos for those artists.

Stan Twitter has also been highlighted for commonly sharing memes within respective communities and utilizing a particular vernacular and terminology. Online stan accounts are frequently run by impassioned teenagers, who often add a distinct touch to their tweets, in contrast to "anonymous accounts jockeying to be the most official unofficial fan source" that can "take on a corporate monotone on par with many singers' own junket." An artist's fanbase is often attached to a nickname used in the media, and in some cases given by the artists themselves. Some social media accounts focused on delivering film, music, and miscellaneous celebrity news, such as Pop Crave, Pop Base, and Film Updates, have been recognized as relevant outlets and aggregators within these stan communities.

Some outlets have also touched on stans being "toxic" in their fanaticism. The subculture has been noted by the BBC for displaying a trend of "toxic fandom" which includes fans joining to bully or harass others in the name of an artist. Entertainment Weekly quoted Jordan Miller as stating "[Stans] will eat their own"; Miller runs BreatheHeavy.com, "a pop music website that for many years was the premier Britney Spears fansite."

El Hunt of NME wrote, "most of the time, stanning is harmless. It's old-fashioned fandom for the internet age. But often, stanning manifests as a kind of blind, unquestioning devotion – the kind of thing that leads the BTS Army to talk about their idols like they're gods on earth who can't be criticised," and added that "at its worst, [stanning] can lead to threatening behaviour, mob-handed bullying and it can even turn on the object of affection."

Stans are consumers of a particular medium, whether they are consuming music of their favorite artists, stories written by their favorite writers, or video content by their favorite online content creators. The evolution of the online space has created opportunities for fans to become active consumers, thus enriching their fan experience. The stan culture on Twitter has also found its way onto other social media platforms, for example, influencing the "#floptok" community on TikTok. The community has created in-jokes centered around Floptropica. Described by The Guardian as "a beautiful testament to the power of the digital hivemind and it's so ridiculously stupid", Floptropica is a fictional nation with a community-developed history that "[claims] unwitting and oblivious real-life people as figureheads".

=== Memes and terminology ===
Stan Twitter community members often share memes with each other and on their Twitter accounts. Polygon wrote about how those in Stan Twitter share memes with the belief that the memes have an insular quality to them. One meme, "Stan Twitter, do you know this song?" was noted by media outlets as particularly popular among Stan Twitter, being able to intersect more specific communities. Polygon described that the meme "seems very silly at first glance," as it is "expressed through an overly obnoxious all-caps exclamation, [and] pairs the sentence with theme songs from early 1990s TV shows, random YouTube videos, anime tracks, High School Musical remixes and random one hit wonders." Polygon further noted that the meme was "designed around nostalgia-baiting people who love to bring up beloved childhood memories.

The terminology used by the Stan Twitter community has also been the subject of discussion. Much of the community's slang originated in African-American Vernacular English (AAVE), with various sources writing about how many Stan Twitter users have appropriated AAVE terms. The terms tea and wig have been attributed to African-American LGBTQ communities; the term wig particularly has been attributed to the drag community, specifically from the phrase "wig snatched" used by the black LGBTQ ballroom culture of the 1980s. The Daily Dot and Billboard credited American singer Katy Perry's usage of the term on American Idol with helping propel its popularity online. The popular internet meme of Kermit the Frog sipping tea has also been frequently paired with the tea term.

The term stan itself is used as both a noun and verb with many variants, including "[I or we] stan", which is a phrase used to express a liking of, as well as praise or support of, any person or artistic work. Aside from the term stan itself, common words and phrases used in the community include: cancelled, keysmash, fancam, moots, ijbol, tea, tw, cw, oomf, naur, wig, and skinny legend. (Note: These phrases are cited as stan terminology by the following sources:)

=== Contrast with "local" Twitter ===
A key component of the Stan Twitter culture is its contrast with Local Twitter; individuals deemed part of Local Twitter are colloquially referred to as simply locals. The Verge likened local to past terms such as square and normie. The publication wrote that "much like being basic, but online, 'local Twitter' describes someone who loves decidedly, even painfully mainstream things." The Atlantic described Local Twitter as a group of "mostly white, well-adjusted suburban teens who share stale platitudes of the kind that some Internet users might call 'basic'."

Local Twitter is also sometimes referred to as Bare Minimum Twitter. Polygon defined Local Twitter as the "general population of Twitter—people not congregated around specific interests or in defined communities." In the context of Stan Twitter terminology, local is similar to a pejorative term. Stans are noted to view locals as a group that causes memes and jokes to lose their humor.

=== Political activism ===
In 2020, Stan Twitter, in particular K-pop fan accounts, received media attention over its involvement in American politics. During the 2020 Democratic presidential primaries, some Nicki Minaj fans expressed support for Bernie Sanders using the hashtag #Barbz4Bernie. During the George Floyd protests, many hashtags opposed to the Black Lives Matter movement, including #AllLivesMatter, #WhiteLivesMatter, #WhiteoutWednesday, and #BlueLivesMatter, were flooded with images and videos of K-pop artists to drown out those using them. Similarly, when the Dallas Police Department asked people on Twitter to submit videos of protesters, its iWatch Dallas app was instead flooded with fancams.

The Verge noted that despite these K-pop fandoms showing support for Black Lives Matter, many Black K-pop fans continue to face racism online. K-pop stans and TikTok users also took credit for falsely requesting tickets to President Trump's Tulsa rally on June 20, 2020, leading to a disappointing turnout. US Representative Alexandria Ocasio-Cortez commented on the event, tweeting "KPop allies, we see and appreciate your contributions in the fight for justice too."

The New York Times noted that "the recent turn toward political activism in the United States also follows a concerted effort by K-pop fans in recent years to make positive change en masse, in part as a reaction to the groups' reputations as superficial, silly and even menacing mobs".

During the 2022 Philippine presidential election season, K-pop stans had started voter education campaigns to empower their fellow fans, organized food pantries to help others in need and created posts, groups, hashtags and fanpages supporting then-Vice President Leni Robredo, detracting any hashtag that would smear her reputation as a presidential candidate.

== Controversial incidents ==
=== Artist–stan relationships ===
The culture of Stan Twitter has been noted by media outlets and celebrities as "toxic". Huffington Post noted that singer Alessia Cara lamented over the "toxicity" of Stan Twitter; she was quoted, "This whole world of stan culture, while it's amazing and great and connective a lot of the time, it can be very hurtful."

There have been several instances of celebrities deactivating or taking a break from using their social media accounts due to harassment directed at them from stans. In 2016, Normani, formerly of Fifth Harmony, briefly quit using Twitter due to racist harassment and abuse from stans of bandmate Camila Cabello. In 2017, American rapper Cupcakke also opted to stop using Twitter because she received death threats from BTS stans, after she made a sexual comment about member Jungkook. Millie Bobby Brown, an actress most notable for her role in Stranger Things, also deactivated her Twitter account due to a meme popular in the Stan Twitter community. The meme falsely attributed violent and homophobic language and behavior to Brown. Critics of the meme expressed that the meme bullied Brown.

Aside from deactivating their accounts, artists have also addressed their fans, requesting them to not go after those perceived to be critical or detrimental to the artist. In a light-hearted post, singer-songwriter Bebe Rexha mentioned her father's critical take on her more "risqué scenes" in her "Last Hurrah" music video. Some of her stans posted "mean" comments about her father in response, which led her to state, "Don't say mean things about my dad, please."

=== Media–stan incidents ===
NBC affiliate WMAQ-TV in Chicago was the target of an online campaign by BTS and Shinee stans, using the hashtag #NBCChicagoApologize, in December 2017 after mistakenly running a video of BTS from their appearance on The Ellen DeGeneres Show in November while reporting on Shinee founding member Jonghyun, who had died by suicide that month. The station apologized for the mistake on the morning newscast and on the station's social media accounts the next day.

A similar incident happened with the Australian Nine Network program 20 to One when on June 19, 2019, the presenters cracked several jokes at the expense of BTS, including comparing their popularity to the explosion of a North Korean nuclear bomb. BTS stans demanded an apology from the presenters, causing them to trend the hashtag #ChannelNineApologize, for which Nine issued an apology the next day, saying, "We apologize to any who may have been offended by last night's episode."

Newsweek and The Inquisitr covered a 2018 incident involving the Barbz (a name for stans of Nicki Minaj) sending hate mail and death threats to blogger Wanna Thompson after Thompson suggested Minaj release more mature music. Thompson described the messages, stating "You have these stans camped out on Twitter and [Instagram] with someone else's face in their [profile picture] hurling insults because they can." Minaj replied to the situation, citing "Pills n Potions", "Bed of Lies", and "All Things Go" as examples of mature music in her discography.

=== Other incidents ===
In June 2019, Nicole Curran, the wife of Golden State Warriors owner Joe Lacob, was the target of online harassment and death threats by Beyoncé stans. This was the result of a video which showed her leaning past Beyoncé to speak to Jay-Z during a Warriors game. In an Instagram post, Beyoncé's publicist addressed the incident and stated, "I also want to speak here to the beautiful BeyHiVE. I know your love runs deep but that love has to be given to every human. It will bring no joy to the person you love so much if you spew hate in her name."

In October 2019, the pop punk band Yellowcard were the target of social media backlash from Juice Wrld stans using the hashtag #FuckYellowcard after former members of the group sued the rapper for $15 million, claiming that his hit song "Lucid Dreams" copied the melody of their song "Holly Wood Died". Most of the backlash had been from the band extending "a deadline for defendants to respond to the lawsuits" into February 2020 following Juice Wrld's death in December 2019.

In the wake of April 2020 reports of North Korean Supreme Leader Kim Jong-un having potentially died, many Twitter users were noted by media outlets as stanning his sister and speculated successor Kim Yo-jong. Some users were also noted to post fancams of Kim Yo-jong. While some users defended their post as jokes, media outlets and other users criticized the stanning of Kim, even if done in jest.

== See also ==
- Black Twitter
- Celebrity worship syndrome
- Club Chalamet
- Larries
- Oshikatsu
- Parasocial interaction
- Ricardo López
- Sasaeng fan
- Teenybopper
- Yas
