= Pop Crave =

Celebrity news Twitter account

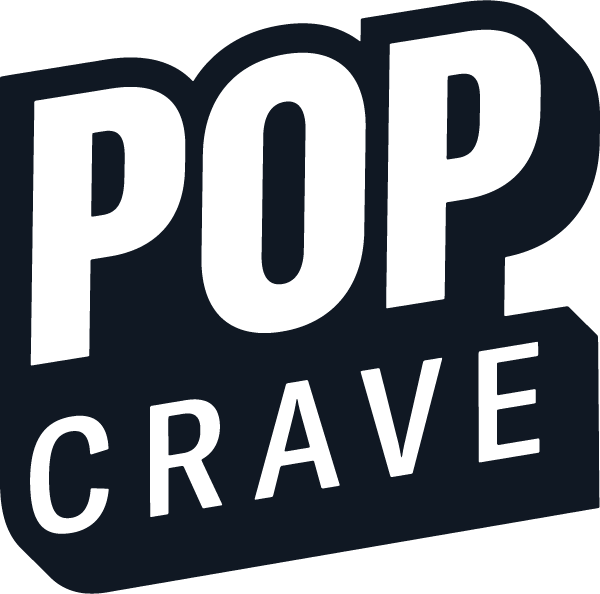
- Available in: English
- Headquarters: Miami, Florida
- Creator: Will Cosme
- Website: popcrave.com
- Commercial: Yes
- Launched: December 2015; 10 years ago
- Current status: Active

X information
- Handle: @popcrave
- Followers: 6.6 million
- Last updated: August 7, 2026

Pop Crave is a media and news company, founded by Will Cosme in December 2015 and headquartered in Miami, Florida. The company is known for posting celebrity news and updates to its X account, which often go viral due to how often and quickly the outlet can publish posts. As of August 2026, Pop Crave has a total of 6.6 million followers on X.

== Background ==
Pop Crave offers entertainment and celebrity news in the form of short snippets posted to their social media accounts, taking advantage of the ability to post to such platforms quickly and consistently. Their posts predominantly cater towards the online "Stan Twitter" community, often celebrating notable pop culture anniversaries or celebrity birthdays alongside chart data and breaking news. The account also aggregates headlines from other sources as part of their reporting, often tagging the original publication or linking back to the initial article.

Pop Crave's social media accounts were first created by Will Cosme in December 2015 under the name PopCultureShady, later relaunching in 2016 under its current name. The account primarily focused on music updates, such as new releases and streaming data, but would later expand to cover wider pop culture topics including film and television and trending news topics.

Cosme has since engaged a small number of volunteer editors to assist in posting and has launched a functional news site for the outlet to provide longer-form pop culture stories, highlight trending news and provide exclusive celebrity interviews.

== Notable coverage ==
Journalists have noted that despite the lack of original content or interest in political reporting from Pop Crave, the account highlights the way Generation Z has turned to seeking news coverage from social and alternative media platforms.

A tweet from Pop Crave reporting on Live Nation Entertainment's decision to stop obscuring hidden ticketing fees in response to pressure from Joe Biden was quote-tweeted by his official presidential campaign Twitter account, prompting Pop Crave to respond "Thank you, Mr. President."

Rolling Stone and Yahoo! Finance have highlighted Pop Crave for breaking down the genesis and importance of streaming numbers in the music industry.

== Influence ==
The large following of Pop Crave has led to the creation of similar celebrity update accounts, most notably the anonymously run Pop Base, which launched in July 2019 and has been able to amass a comparable following of 1.7 million followers on X. Pop Crave and its main competitor Pop Base have gained recognition not only for their content but also for instances of viral misinformation. Both are currently ranked among the Top 200 most community-noted accounts on X.

Pop Crave's success has led to the creation of multiple satirical parody accounts, one of which, named Poo Crave, on occasion caused confusion amongst readers who believed their posts were indeed news stories from the official account.

=== Pope Crave ===
Following the success of Conclave (2024), a fan account called Pope Crave was created in December 2024. After the death of Pope Francis in April 2025, the account started posting about the 2025 papal conclave, quickly amassing almost 100,000 followers on X (formerly Twitter) Following the election of Pope Leo XIV, the account creators have been profiled by Time Magazine, Rolling Stone, and The New York Times, among others.
