= Gloucester County Institute of Technology =

Technical high school in Gloucester County, New Jersey, US

Location
- 1360 Tanyard Road; Deptford Township, Gloucester County, New Jersey 08080; United States; 39.7884°N 75.1228°W

Information
- Type: Vo-tech public high school
- Established: 1971
- School district: Gloucester County Vocational-Technical School District
- NCES School ID: 340604002570
- Principal: Sybil Girard
- Faculty: 110.0 FTEs
- Grades: 9-12
- Enrollment: 1,657 (as of 2024–25)
- Student to teacher ratio: 15.1:1
- Colors: Navy Blue and Silver
- Athletics conference: Tri-County Conference
- Team name: Cheetahs
- Publication: Cheetah News
- Website: www.gcit.org

The Gloucester County Institute of Technology (GCIT) is a four-year vocational-technical public high school located in Deptford Township in Gloucester County, in the U.S. state of New Jersey. Established in 1971, the school operates as part of the Gloucester County Vocational-Technical School District. The school has a Sewell mailing address.

GCIT offers twenty full-time programs. Students must apply and be selected to attend GCIT. GCIT currently accepts approximately 400 students per year. Acceptance is based on final marking period grades from 7th grade and the beginning marking period grades for 8th grade, and state standardized test scores, attendance and a mandatory shadow visit.

As of the 2024–25 school year, the school had an enrollment of 1,657 students and 110.0 classroom teachers (on an FTE basis), for a student–teacher ratio of 15.1:1. There were 138 students (8.3% of enrollment) eligible for free lunch and 59 (3.6% of students) eligible for reduced-cost lunch.

== History ==
During the 2021–22 school year, Deptford Township Schools announced it would no longer pay tuition for students attending GCIT for programs that were also being provided at Deptford Township High School. The decision impacted students wishing to attend GCIT's Carpentry, Computer Sciences, Engineering, or Health Sciences programs. The district defended its decision despite a letter from the New Jersey Department of Education saying that Deptford "is responsible for tuition and transportation costs of any resident student admitted to the county vocational school."

== Academics and programs ==
GCIT offers college preparatory (CP) and honors courses for all students. GCIT offers language courses in Spanish, Latin, and Italian. Two years of a language are required to graduate, but four levels are offered.

GCIT offers several electives besides their programs. Students may choose from Rowan College of South Jersey courses instead of taking high school electives to receive dual credit; the Middle States Association of Colleges and Schools recognizes GCIT as an RCSJ teaching site, allowing students to graduate with associate degrees before they finish high school. The tuition for these courses is paid by the district. GCIT also offers clubs, which are built into the school bell schedule. GCIT follows the National Academy Foundation's cooperative learning initiative, where teachers focus on group discussions, projects, and research papers.

In 2020, GCIT announced plans to establish a new program, the Academy of Advanced Manufacturing & Applied Science, in response to an elevated interest in Gloucester County's manufacturing industry. The program opened during the 2023–2024 school year, with students attending class in a new building located on the adjacent Rowan College of South Jersey campus.

=== High school ===
High school programs for the 2026-27 school year include:

- Advanced Manufacturing & Applied Science
- Academy of Education
- Automotive Technology
- Baking & Pastry Arts
- Biological Sciences
- Carpentry
- Computer Science
- Cosmetology
- Criminal Justice
- Culinary Arts
- Digital Media
- Education
- Electrical
- Engineering
- Finance & Business Management
- Health Sciences
- HVAC/R
- Performing Arts: Dance
- Performing Arts: Drama
- Plumbing
- Welding

=== Adult programs ===
Adult programs as of the 2025-26 school year include:

- Automotive
- Baking & Pastry Arts
- Carpentry
- Culinary Arts
- Computer Technology
- Electrical Apprenticeship
- Fire Inspection
- HVAC Apprenticeship
- Plumbing Apprenticeship
- Welding

== Awards, recognition and rankings ==
GCIT is generally the highest ranked high school in Gloucester County; in 2025, GCIT was ranked 117th of 428 high schools statewide by Niche, and NJ Advance Media ranked GCIT 52nd of 358 high schools statewide based on public school data from the New Jersey Department of Education.

== Athletics ==
The GCIT Cheetahs compete as one of the member schools in the Tri-County Conference, which is comprised of 21 public and private high schools located in Camden, Cape May, Cumberland, Gloucester, and Salem counties. The conference is overseen by the New Jersey State Interscholastic Athletic Association (NJSIAA). With 1,209 athletes in grades 9-12 as of the 2022–2023 school year, the school was classified by the NJSIAA as Group IV for most athletic competition purposes, which included schools with an enrollment of 1,060 to 5,049 students in that grade range. The Cheetahs is the name of all GCIT's sporting teams.

GCIT's varsity softball team successfully defended the NJTAC state tournament title in 2007, defeating Sussex County Technical School 22–1. GCIT's boys' soccer team has made the New Jersey state playoffs for two consecutive years, and its boys' baseball team has won back-to-back state championships.

Annabelle Carter (2026) is the first New Jersey girls' bowler to win 2 individual state titles, in her freshman and senior years (2023, 2026).

Boys' Teams	Girls' Teams	Co-Ed Teams
Varsity and JV Soccer	Varsity and JV Soccer	Cross Country: Varsity Boys and Varsity Girls
Varsity and JV Volleyball	Varsity and JV Volleyball	Bowling: Varsity and JV Boys, Varsity and JV Girls, and Varsity Co-Ed
Varsity and JV Tennis	Varsity Tennis	Swimming: Varsity Boys, Varsity Girls, and Varsity Co-Ed
Varsity, JV, and FR Basketball	Varsity, JV, and FR Basketball	Cheerleading: Varsity Co-Ed, and JV Co-Ed
Varsity and JV Baseball	Varsity, JV, and FR Softball	Golf: Varsity Boys, Varsity Girls, and Varsity Co-Ed
Varsity Diving	Varsity Diving	
	Varsity and JV Field Hockey	

GCIT has an Olympic-size swimming pool and a fitness room with free weights and treadmills, which were completed as part of a $9.9 million expansion project approved in 1993. The pool is used for practice by 13 members of the Tri-County Conference and a USA Swimming team. The pool hosted the 2014 Big East Conference Swimming & Diving Championships. GCIT currently allows the public to use the pool and fitness rooms at set times for set fees. Students gain free, unlimited access to these facilities.

GCIT currently offers many sports but does not have its own football team, which is common in vocational schools. Currently, students who want to play football or any other that sport GCIT does not offer are permitted to play on their home district's team.

=== Community ===
GCIT offers several services to the public. Its School of Cosmetology offers salon services. The School of Culinary Arts offers a catering menu and takes orders for the bakery. The School of Transportation offers services for live work. The Fitness Center and pool are open for the Gloucester County residents and members.

GCIT is also involved in community projects, including the City of Hope Walk, Style-A-Thon, Out of the Darkness Suicide Prevention Walk, Love Our Vets, and others. In addition, the HOSA club holds an annual blood drive for the American Red Cross.

=== School Based Youth Services ===
School Based Youth Services (SBYS) offers free counseling for teenagers between the ages of 13 and 19 who live in Gloucester County. They also provide counseling for their family members. SBYS is open from 8AM to 8PM on Mondays to Thursdays and 8AM to 3PM on Fridays. SBYS provides counseling on a wide variety of topics, including drugs, stress, depression, sexual orientation, family problems, and others. SBYS also organizes recreational activities for the students of GCIT.

=== Youth One Stop GED Program ===
The Youth One Stop GED Program provides GED test preparation to out-of-school teens in Gloucester County. They work with teens between the ages of 16–21. They also offer students recreational trips, community services, and other programs. The One Stop Youth Center is open from 8AM to 4PM Mondays to Thursdays. The One Stop Youth Center provides a monetary reward weekly for meeting their educational and attendance objectives.

== School newspaper ==
GCIT's school newspaper is Cheetah News.

== Notable alumni ==
- Anthony Potero, content creator and social media influencer

== Administration ==
The school's principal is Sybil Girard. Her administration team includes five assistant principals.
