= Spot the difference =

Image-based puzzle

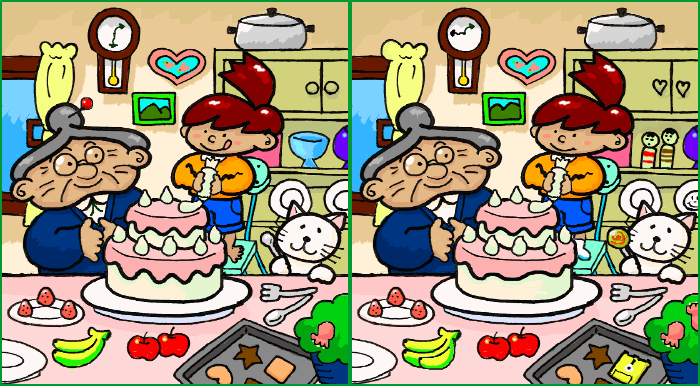
Example of a children's spot the difference puzzle. There are 15 differences between the two pictures.

Spot the difference is a type of puzzle where players must identify subtle differences between two otherwise similar images.

== Description ==
Spot the difference games are found in various media including activity books for children, newspapers, and video games. They are a type of puzzle where players must find a set number of differences between two otherwise similar images, whether they are illustrations or photographs that have been altered with photo manipulation.

== Solving techniques ==
Visual comparison may be used to solve the puzzle. The solution to the puzzle is often listed nearby or in an accompanying answer page of a puzzle book. Additionally, one can cross one's eyes and merge the two pictures into one, in the much the same way as when viewing an autostereogram picture. The differences will appear to blink in and out of one's vision. This is a very effective method of solving these puzzles.

=== Overlay ===
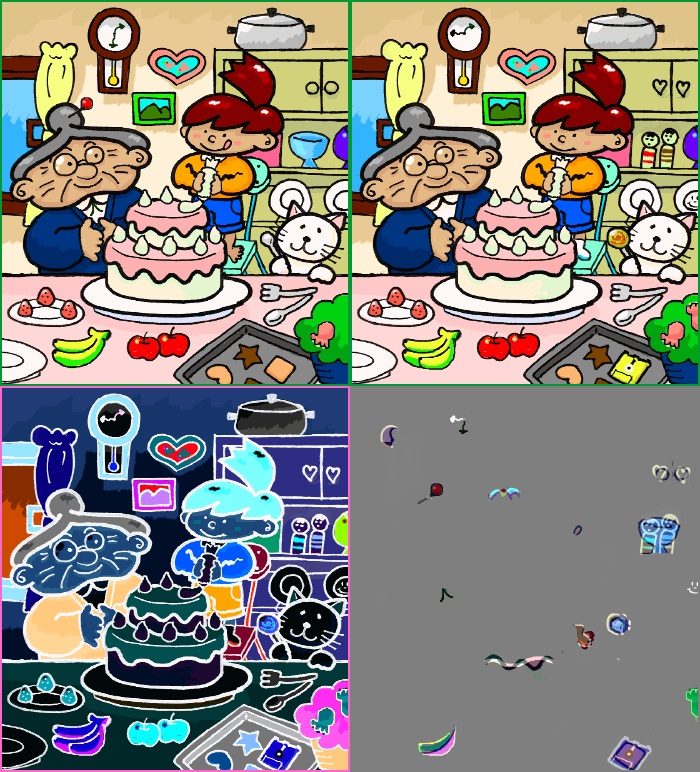
Solving "Spot the difference" by overlaying the left image (top left) with an inverse image (bottom left) of the right one (top right). Differences appear as non grey parts (bottom right)

A way to solve a spot the difference puzzle is to digitally compute the difference pixel by pixel. This requires both images to be perfectly aligned. In the presence of distortions, e.g. when taken from a photo, the image registration problem has to be solved before overlay is possible.

To compute a pixelwise image difference $p_1-p_2$ an inverse version of the first image $1-p_1$ can be overlaId with 50% of the other, i.e. $\frac{1}{2}(1-p_1)+\frac{1}{2}p_2$.

== See also ==
- Photo Hunt
- The Exit 8
