= Photo Hunt =

- Developer(s): Merit Games
- Platform(s): Megatouch

Photo Hunt is a spot the difference game featured on coin-operated Megatouch touchscreen video games primarily found in bars, restaurants, and taverns in the United States. Megatouch games were developed by Merit Entertainment in Bristol, Pennsylvania. Photo Hunt has been reworked as a downloadable version for the iPhone and iPod touch.

Megatouch also released a variant of the game called Erotic Photo Hunt, which featured sexually explicit photos.

== Gameplay ==
Photo Hunt is a spot the difference game. In each level, players are shown two photos—side-by-side—that are identical except for five differences. The objective is to find and identify the differences between the pictures before the timer runs out. Players select potential differences by touching the screen on either picture in the location of difference. Correct choices encircle the difference in green and incorrect touches deduct time, with the game ending if time expires on any level. Upon clearing a level, bonus points are awarded for the time remaining and the timer is refreshed for the next level, where it decreases more quickly.

Depending on the settings, players are provided either 3 or 5 hints for use during the course of one game. The number of remaining hints is indicated by the number of magnifying glass images centered at the top of bottom of the screen. Players touch one of these icons to reveal one of the remaining differences. Differences located by hints are immediately counted as found and are surrounded by a yellow circle.

== Development ==
Megatouch products were produced by Merit Industries, with games were developed by Merit Entertainment in Bristol, Pennsylvania. Megatouch also released a variant of the game called Erotic Photo Hunt, which featured sexually explicit photos.

== Availability ==
The game is featured on Megatouch game systems, which are coin-operated, touchscreen video games primarily found in bars, restaurants, and taverns. Photo Hunt has been reworked as a downloadable version for the iPhone and iPod touch.
