= Gloucester County Vocational-Technical School District =

School district in Gloucester County, New Jersey, US

Address
- 1360 Tanyard Road Deptford Township, Gloucester County, New Jersey, 08080; United States
- Coordinates: 39.78942°N 75.126168°W

District information
- Grades: Vocational
- Superintendent: Susan E. Heiken (acting)
- Business administrator: Debbie Bianchi
- Schools: 1

Students and staff
- Enrollment: 1,597 (as of 2023–24)
- Faculty: 110.0 FTEs
- Student–teacher ratio: 14.5:1

Other information
- Website: www.gcit.org
Ind.	Per pupil	District spending	Rank (*)	Vocational average	%± vs. average
1A	Total Spending	$10,123	1	$18,891	−46.4%
1	Budgetary Cost	13,434	5	17,296	−22.3%
2	Classroom Instruction	7,014	3	9,045	−22.5%
6	Support Services	1,896	10	2,269	−16.4%
8	Administrative Cost	986	1	2,353	−58.1%
10	Operations & Maintenance	2,933	11	3,014	−2.7%
13	Extracurricular Activities	488	13	464	5.2%
16	Median Teacher Salary	62,400	13	65,035
Data from NJDoE 2014 Taxpayers' Guide to Education Spending. *Of Vocational districts with any number of students. Lowest spending=1; Highest=21

The Gloucester County Vocational-Technical School District is a vocational public school district located in the Sewell section of Deptford Township, New Jersey, serving the vocational and educational needs of both public high school students in ninth through twelfth grades and adult students across Gloucester County.

As of the 2023–24 school year, the district, comprised of one school, had an enrollment of 1,597 students and 110.0 classroom teachers (on an FTE basis), for a student–teacher ratio of 14.5:1.

== School ==
- Gloucester County Institute of Technology in Sewell had an enrollment of 1,639 students in grades 9–12 as of the 2022–23 school year.
  - Sybil Girard, principal

== Administration ==
Core members of the district's administration are:

- Susan E. Heiken, acting superintendent
- Debbie Bianchi, business administrator and board secretary

== Board of education ==
The district's board of education is comprised of the county superintendent of schools and six individuals appointed by the Board of County Commissioners. Members serve three-year terms of office, with two seats up for reappointment each year. The board appoints a superintendent to oversee the district's day-to-day operations and a business administrator to supervise the business functions of the district.
