= Pop Base =

Pop culture news account

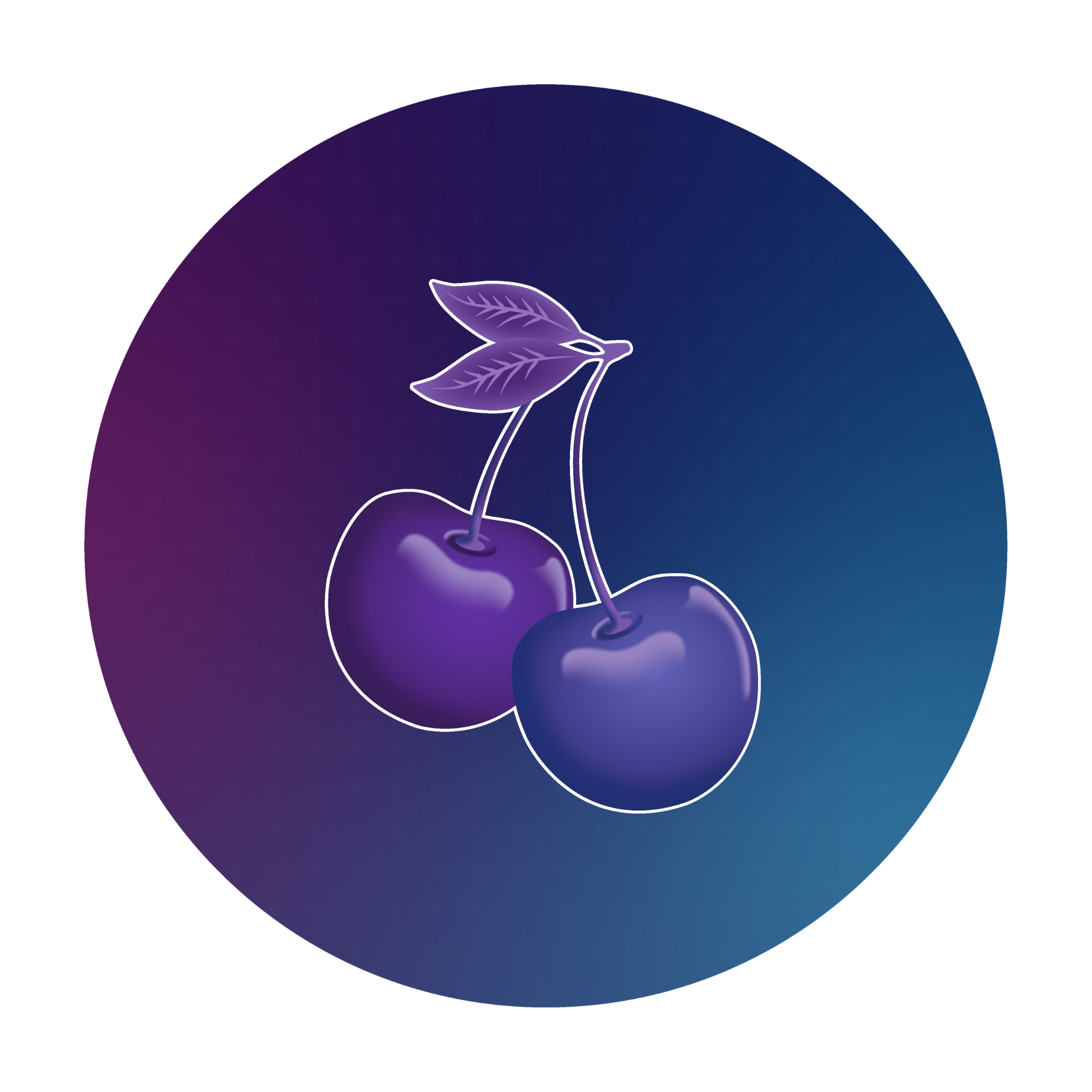
- Founded: June 2019; 7 years ago
- Type: Pop culture news
- Owner: Unknown
- Website: popbase.tv

Instagram information
- Page: popbase
- Followers: 365,000

TikTok information
- Page: popbase
- Followers: 68,000

X information
- Handle: @popbase
- Followers: 6.9 million
- Last updated: August 27, 2026

Pop Base is an American social media-based entertainment news account that operates primarily on X. It is known for posting frequent, short-form updates related to pop culture, celebrity news, and entertainment trends. Launched in mid-2019, Pop Base is part of a group of anonymously operated "stan culture" accounts that have gained large followings among Gen Z users.

As of May 2025, it has 2 million followers and received attention for its coverage of both entertainment and political developments.

== Background ==
Pop Base was launched in 2019 amid the growth of social media accounts centered on fan culture and entertainment. It shares frequent updates on music, television, and celebrity news, in a visual, headline-driven format.

Although its main focus is entertainment, Pop Base has also shared updates on political and cultural topics. Its posting style has been noted as appealing to younger audiences who may engage less with traditional journalism.

Pop Base is frequently compared to Pop Crave, though the two accounts operate independently.

== History ==
Pop Base began as a fan-focused account covering celebrity birthdays, music releases, and viral trends. It emerged alongside other anonymous "stan" accounts that gained visibility by posting entertainment updates in real time.

Its following grew during the COVID-19 pandemic. During this time, Pop Base frequently shared music chart data, livestream announcements, and breaking celebrity news.

By 2023, the account had surpassed one million followers and expanded its scope to include major legal cases, political events, and Supreme Court decisions. In the lead-up to the 2024 U.S. presidential election, it posted real-time updates from debates, conventions, and political events. Its content related to the 2024 Democratic National Convention was widely circulated across platforms.

In August 2023, Pop Base was among the first accounts to share news of President Donald Trump's third indictment, before confirmation from mainstream outlets. This post was later cited in discussions about the speed and influence of social media reporting.

In May 2026, Pop Base announced an official affiliation with Indonesian Pop Base, an Indonesian entertainment news account and a former spin-off of Pop Base, making it their first official regional branch.

== Content and coverage ==
Pop Base regularly posts about celebrity news, music releases, tour announcements, award shows, and viral social media content.

In 2024, Consequence profiled the account for its theatrical descriptions of K-pop artists such as Seventeen's Mingyu, citing its resonance within fan communities.

The account often posts during major cultural events such as the Met Gala, Grammy Awards, and Academy Awards. It also highlights emerging stories or viral moments that may not yet have received broader attention.

Beyond entertainment, Pop Base occasionally reports on political or cultural developments, including high-profile court rulings or viral political moments. These posts typically present complex issues in simplified formats designed for mobile consumption.

A 2024 Forbes article about misleading parody posts on X included a reference to Pop Base, clarifying that it was not the origin of the satirical content but was noted in discussions of confusion around parody accounts.

== Reception and influence ==
Media outlets have examined Pop Base's role in the evolving landscape of online news consumption. Articles in Fast Company and Vox describe how accounts like Pop Base represent a shift in how younger audiences consume current events and entertainment news through social platforms.

During the 2024 election cycle, Pop Base's political updates were widely shared. Semafor reported that such accounts, by combining informal tone and simplified presentation, occasionally outpaced traditional media in reach and engagement.

Concerns have been raised about the potential for confusion when parody or stylized content resembles verified news. A 2024 Forbes article noted this trend but acknowledged it accounts for a small portion of the platform's content.

=== Spin-offs and fan accounts ===
The success of Pop Base has led to the emergence of numerous unofficial, fan-run, and parody accounts that emulate its format and tone. These accounts are not affiliated with Pop Base but often adopt similar branding, visual styles, and post formats. Examples include parody accounts such as Pob Base and Pop Base Updates, as well as region- or fandom-specific accounts like Pop Base Philippines and Indonesian Pop Base.

These unofficial accounts typically provide entertainment news, fan statistics, award tracking, and streaming updates tailored to their specific audiences. Some, like Pop Base Philippines, have gained visibility within niche communities. In May 2025, the account was cited in online wrestling publications for highlighting the viral success of professional wrestler Joe Hendry's theme song "I Believe in Joe Hendry" on the iTunes Philippines chart. In June, Bini performance of "Blink Twice" on Good Day New York was cited by Philippine news outlets such as Interaksyon, and Philippine Daily Inquirer. Jeline Malasig of Interaksyon described the post sharing the video as "page giving updates on Philippine pop culture".

== See also ==
- Pop Crave
