= AMI Entertainment Network =

Jukebox and music video company (e. 1909)

- Formerly: Automatic Musical Instrument Co.
- Founded: 1909
- Website: amientertainment.com

AMI Entertainment Network is a company owned by the Gores Group that creates original video content and licenses music, sells jukebox hardware, and offers music video services and Tap TV narrowcast television channels. Its history dates to 1909, when the Automatic Musical Instrument Co., began producing player piano rolls.

== History ==
Automatic Musical Instrument Co. (AMI) was founded in 1909, making player piano rolls. It remained focused on automated music and jukeboxes, eventually releasing the first digital jukebox with licensed content. In 2002, the Harbour Group acquired Merit Industries, makers of Megatouch bartop gaming devices. This division was combined with jukebox maker Rowe International—after it was acquired in 2003— to become AMI Entertainment Network, an Internet-based digital content segment, in 2004. Megatouch, LLC was spun into its own entity in 2013 and closed in 2014. At the time, AMI was described as creating original video content and licenses music, selling jukebox hardware, and offering music video services and Tap TV. narrowcast television channels. It acquired NSM Music Group in 2017. In 2017, AMI was acquired by the Gores Group.
