= Danny Cole =

American painter (born 2000)

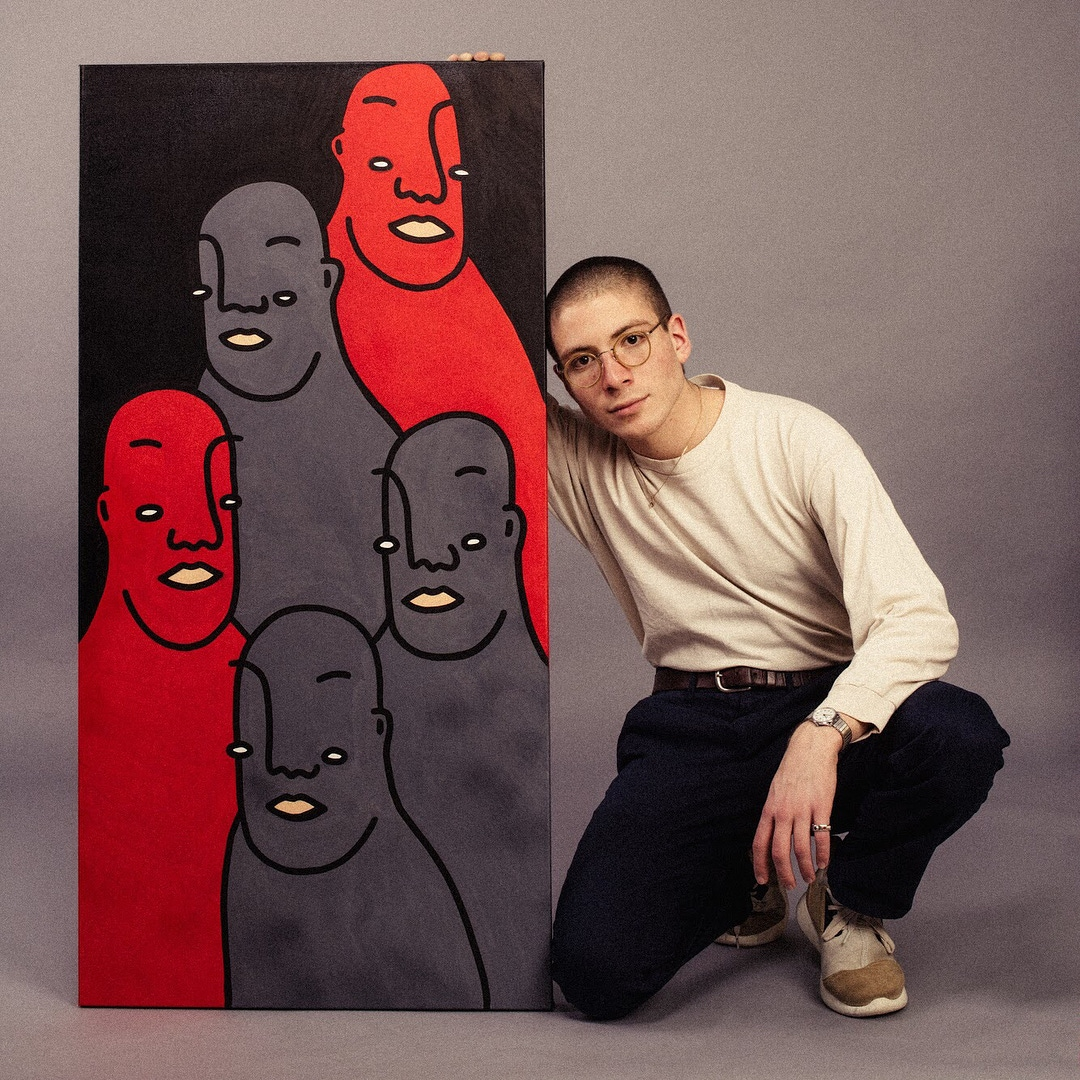
- Cole with his "Creature World" artwork in 2018
- Born: January 10, 2000 (age 26)
- Occupation: Artist
- Years active: 2018-present
- Website: www.creature.world

Danny Cole (born January 10, 2000) is an American painter and interdisciplinary artist based in New York City. He is known for the simple doodled humanoids of his "Creature World" project.

In 2025, Cole was named on Forbes's "30 Under 30" list in the category of "Art and Style".

== Early life ==
Originally from New Jersey, Cole has been creating art since he was a child. He filled journals with drawings before moving to painting.

Cole moved to New York to pursue his career as an artist soon after graduating high school.

== Career ==
Shortly before his high school graduation in 2018, Cole's debut solo show, "Danny Cole's Departure" was held in partnership with Stephan Alexander's Ghost Gallery on the Lower East Side of Manhattan.

That same year, Cole went to Coachella with Portugal. The Man, exhibiting his artwork as the band's live visuals on the festival’s main stage. Also in 2018, Cole directed the animated music video for Cherry Glazerr's song "Daddi".

In 2020, Cole was arrested for his "HollyCow" art installation, erected atop the Hollywood Sign in Los Angeles, California.

In 2021, Cole was selected to participate in a revival of the Cow Parade, sponsored by God’s Love We Deliver.

In 2023, Cole debuted a sculptural show and clothing line at New York Fashion Week.

== Creature World ==
Cole is known for his trademark "Creatures": doodled, simple, round-faced humanoids that the artist says represent "a universal human spirit that transcends age, gender, and nationality".

Multidisciplinary "Creature World" art activations have taken place, integrating mediums including painting, music, performance, dance, poetry, and cuisine.

In 2021, Cole released a collection of 10,000 "Creature World" non-fungible tokens (NFTs), and by 2024, Cole had his work sold to more than 100,000 collectors.

== Reception ==
ArtNews draws parallels between Cole's career and the early careers of Keith Haring, KAWS, and Banksy. "[Like Cole, these artists] got their start by putting their work on the street, getting the public interested in their work before galleries".

Grant Rindner of Nylon Magazine said "Cole's colorful characters are reminiscent of Keith Haring's signature creations, but where movement was central to the pop art icon's work, Cole translates his own thoughts and struggles into static snapshots of personal, private moments."
