= Wayne Diamond =

American fashion designer

- Diamond in 2026
- Born: Long Island, New York, U.S.
- Occupation: Fashion designer
- Children: 4

Wayne Diamond is an American fashion designer, best known for his performance as an exaggerated version of himself in the 2019 Safdie brothers film Uncut Gems.

== Biography ==
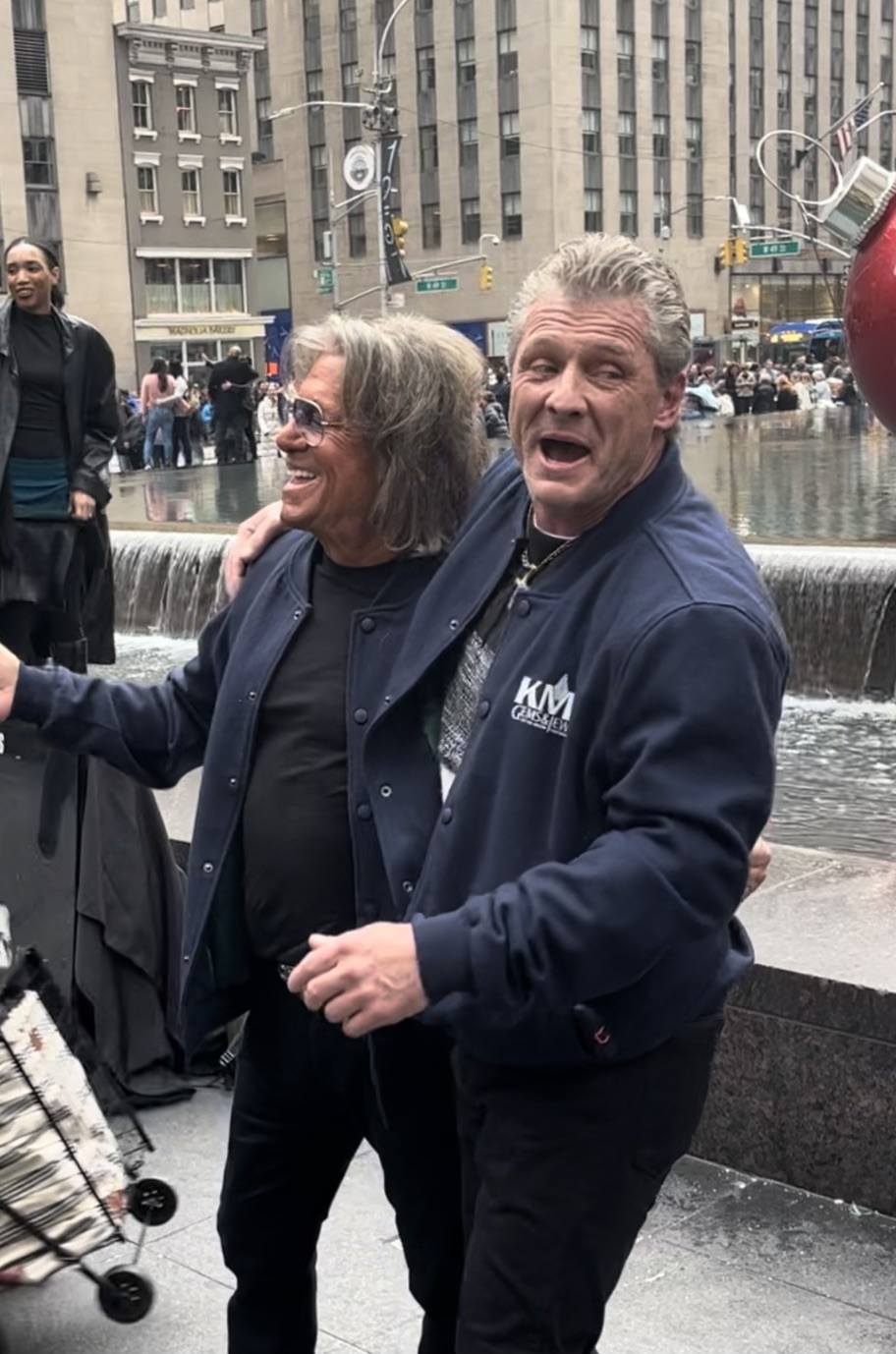
Wayne Diamond with fellow Uncut Gems actor Keith William Richards at Howard Ratner lookalike contest in 2024.

Wayne Diamond was born on Long Island, New York, and grew up in Oceanside with three sisters and one brother. His father, Alan, taught accounting at Nassau Community College and Adelphi University. His mother, Marilyn, was a schoolteacher. Diamond attended Oceanside High School in his youth.

He later founded the dress-maker Diamond's Run during the 1970s, based in the New York City Garment District. He designed for the business through the 1980s, until its sale in the 1990s for $110 million. During this time he spent much of his career working in The Hamptons. Diamond says that he designed every dress Vanna White wore on Wheel of Fortune.

Diamond has been married twice, and he has been married to his second wife for almost four decades. He has four children, including a daughter named Jamie, a teacher at UPenn. Diamond is Jewish.

He is best known for his performance in the Safdie brothers' 2019 film Uncut Gems as a fictionalized version of himself. He has also worked in two horror videos, txt msg and scAIRcrows.
