= Partiful =

Event planning and management platform

- Company type: Private
- Website type: Event planning and management
- Founded: 2019; 7 years ago
- Headquarters: New York City, United States
- Founders: Joy Tao, Shreya Murthy
- Website: partiful.com

Partiful is an event planning and management platform. The service allows users to create events, invite guests (often via text message), and perform various event hosting tasks, including managing RSVPs and sending updates to attendees. Currently, all services are offered free of charge to users, but you need a verified phone number to RSVP.

== History ==
Partiful was founded in 2019 by Joy Tao and Shreya Murthy, who met while working at Palantir Technologies. By 2021, Partiful started to gain followers.

In 2022, the platform secured $20 million in Series A funding that year. The service has seen significant adoption among Gen Z, millennials and startup founders, with Partiful's CEO reporting that the majority of users are under the age of 30.

The company claimed "millions" of active users by the end of 2023. Partiful expanded into iOS and Android apps in 2024.

As of 2025, Partiful was used in over 100 countries.

== Features ==
Partiful allows users to create event invitations using customized templates. Invitations are distributed via links that support RSVP responses and text blasts without requiring account registration or app installation. Hosts can poll guests to coordinate event dates, while guests can interact using emojis and GIFs. The platform supports payment collection through Venmo, Cash App, and PayPal, allows photo sharing, and includes a messaging feature for sending updates and reminders.

== Awards and recognition ==
- Partiful was named a finalist for Apple's App Store Awards for Cultural Impact in 2024.
- Partiful was named Google's Best App of the Year in 2024.
- Partiful was named as one of Time's 100 Most Influential Companies of 2025.
