= Keith William Richards =

American actor (born 1963)

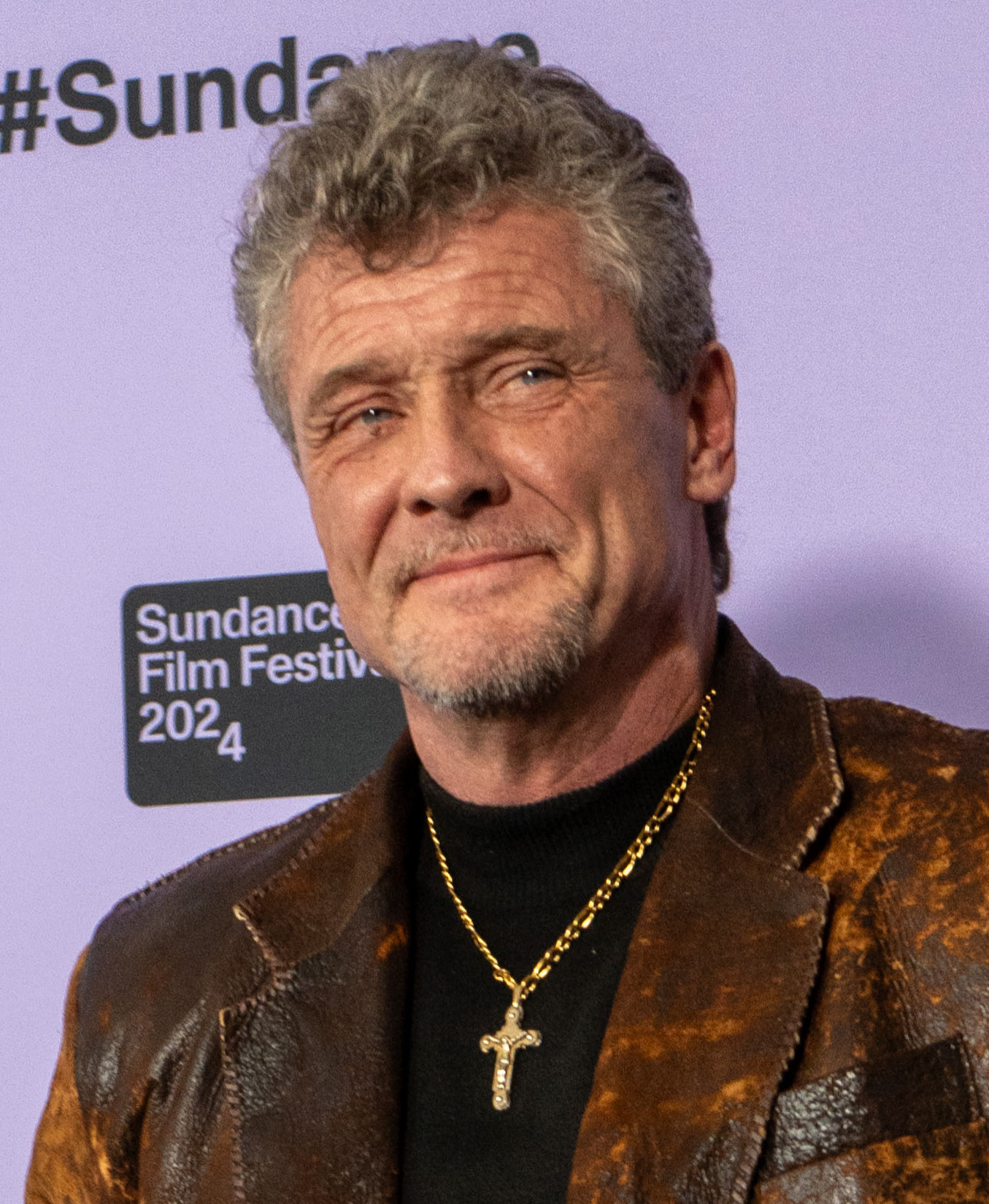
- Richards in 2024
- Born: April 11, 1963 (age 63); New Jersey, U.S
- Occupation: Actor
- Years active: 2019—present

Keith William Richards (born April 11, 1963) is an American actor, best known for playing Phil in the 2019 film Uncut Gems.

== Early life ==
Keith Williams Richards was born in New Jersey. Shortly after his birth, his family moved to Stuyvesant Town in Manhattan's Lower East Side. Richards spent his early childhood in Stuyvesant Town until the age of 10. His family then relocated to South Brooklyn, where he grew up. During the September 11 attacks, Richards was in Manhattan, where he and his colleagues hurried to help the victims.

== Career ==
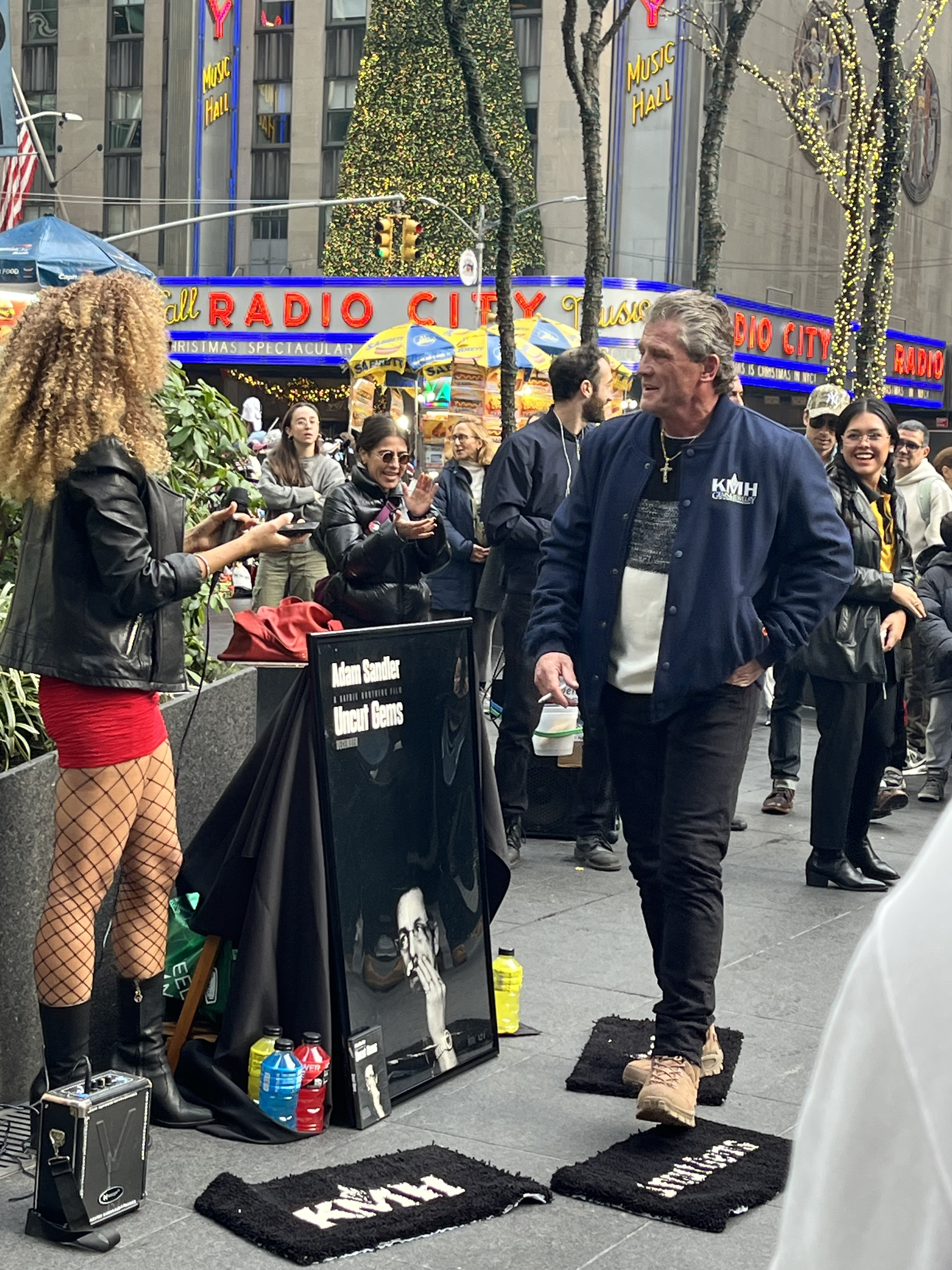
Keith William Richards making a guest appearance at a 2024 Howard Ratner lookalike contest in New York City

Richards began his career as a longshoreman, working on the Red Hook Piers for American Stevedore. After several years, he transitioned into the Carpenters Union, a family tradition.

His appearance into acting came about in unexpected manner. One day, while walking toward the L train Street in New York City, he was approached by Michele Mansoor, an associate of casting director Jennifer Venditti. She inquired about his acting experience, and Richards, having been previously approached but never pursued acting, replied that he had none. Despite his initial reluctance, Mansoor persuaded him to attend an audition. This chance encounter eventually led to his debut role in the film Uncut Gems in 2019 and the film was nominated for multiple awards and won seven of them. Following his debut, he started appearing in a variety of films In 2024, Richards played his first lead role, pitcher Ed Mortanian in the sports film Eephus.

In 2025, Richards starred in 8:48, a short film and music video directed by Kevin Lombardo. The project, featuring lyrics by attorney and songwriter Matthew Baione, was produced in collaboration with Pitta & Baione LLP and Keep Good Company Records. 8:48 was filmed at the historic St. George Theatre on Staten Island, and premiered at the 9/11 Memorial & Museum on January 30, 2025.

== Personal life ==
In an interview with Uproxx in 2019, Richards revealed that he was diagnosed with throat cancer. Richards explained in the same interview that his cancer came from being exposed to Ground Zero toxic dust. He has since been able to seek medical treatment through benefits of the World Trade Center Health Program.

== Filmography ==
=== Film ===
Year	Title	Role	Notes
2019	Uncut Gems	Phil	
2024	Ponyboi	Two-Tone	
2024	Eephus	Ed Mortanian	
TBA	Dirty Finger Nails	TBA	
TBA	Ave U	Tony Bleach	
TBA	Lemonade Blessing	Mitch	

=== Music videos ===
Year	Title	Artist	Role	Notes
2021	"Plant Life"	Parquet Courts	Mr. Blue	
2023	"Monaco"	Bad Bunny	Man in restaurant	Uncredited
