= 13th Streamy Awards =

2023 awards ceremony recognizing online video

- Awarded for: Excellence in online video
- Date: August 27, 2023
- Location: The Fairmont Century Plaza, Los Angeles, California
- Country: United States
- Hosted by: MatPat
- Most awards: MrBeast (2)
- Most nominations: MrBeast (5)

Streaming coverage
- Network: YouTube
- Viewership: 15 million
- Produced by: Dick Clark Productions; Tubefilter

The 13th Annual Streamy Awards was the thirteenth installment of the Streamy Awards honoring the best in American streaming television series and their creators. Produced by Dick Clark Productions and Tubefilter, the ceremony was held at The Fairmont Century Plaza in Beverly Hills, California on August 27, 2023. Hosted by popular creator MatPat, it was the first time the ceremony was held in summer, moved from its previous winter date. A new award called Rolling Stone Sound of the Year Award launched, celebrating songs popular on social media.

== Performers ==
The 13th Streamy Awards featured musical performances from Armani White and Icona Pop.

Performers at the 13th Streamy Awards
Artist(s)	Song(s)
Armani White	"Silver Tooth" "Billie Eilish"
Icona Pop	"Fall in Love" "I Love It"

== Winners and nominees ==
The nominees were announced on July 24, 2023. Winners were announced during the main ceremony on August 27, hosted by MatPat at The Beverly Hilton hotel in Los Angeles.

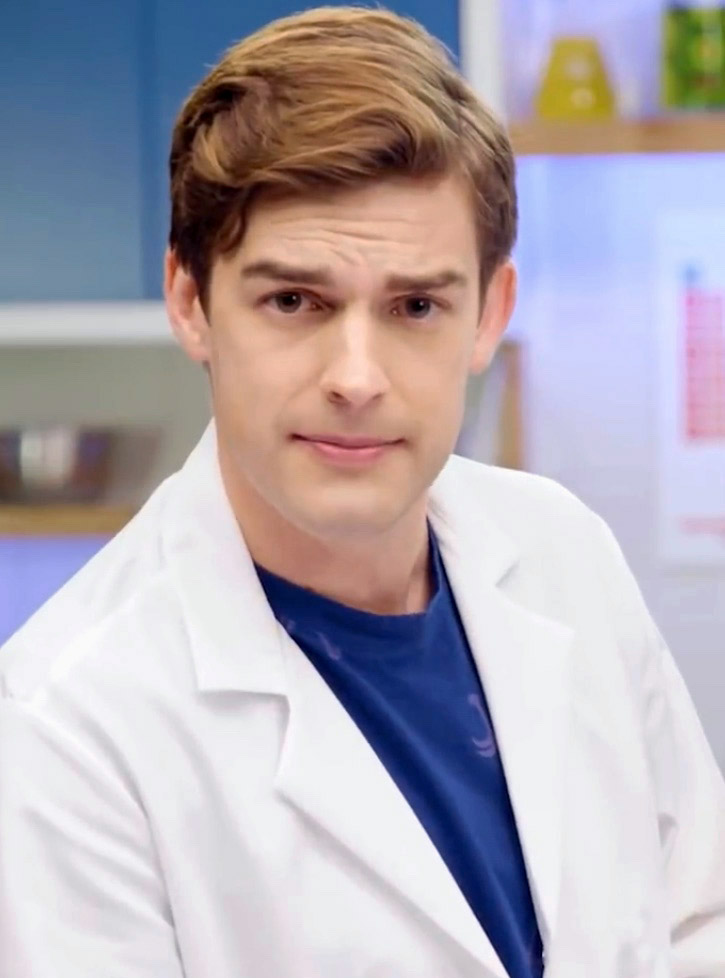
MatPat hosted the show

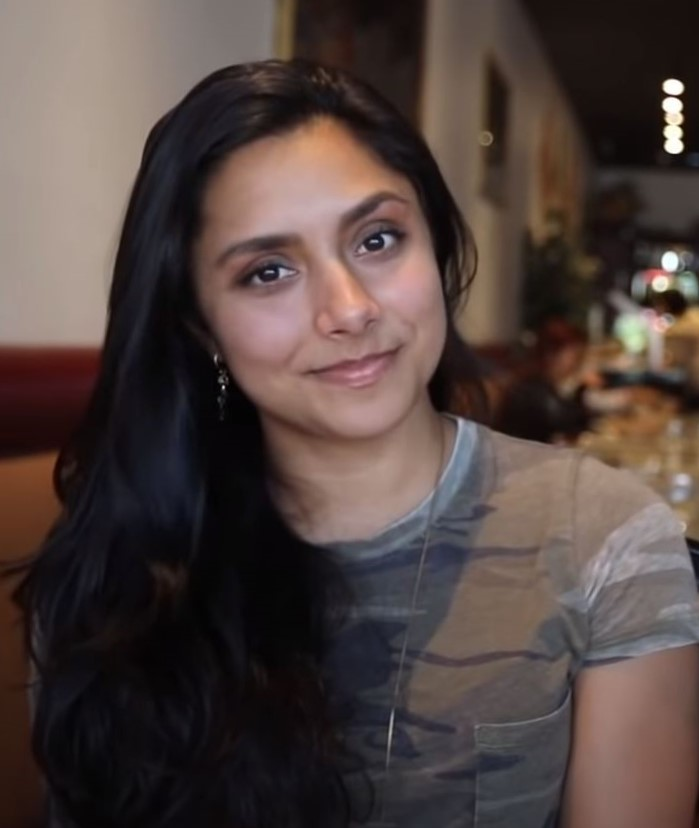
Challenge Accepted by Michelle Khare, winner of the Show of the Year Award

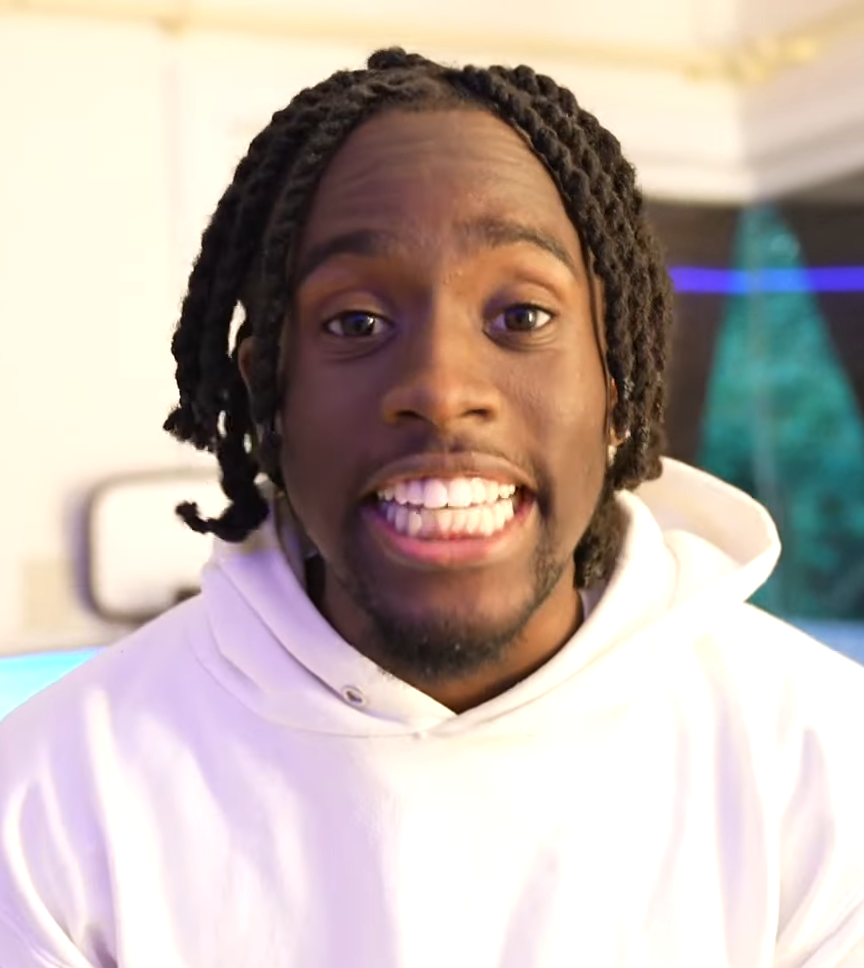
Kai Cenat, winner of the Streamer of the Year Award

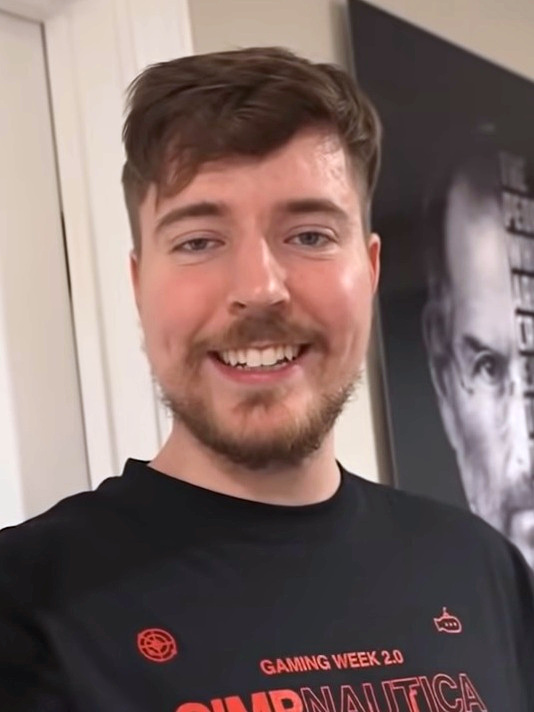
MrBeast, winner of the Creator of the Year and the Collaboration Award alongside Dwayne "The Rock" Johnson for "Surprised he didn't pick rock every time"

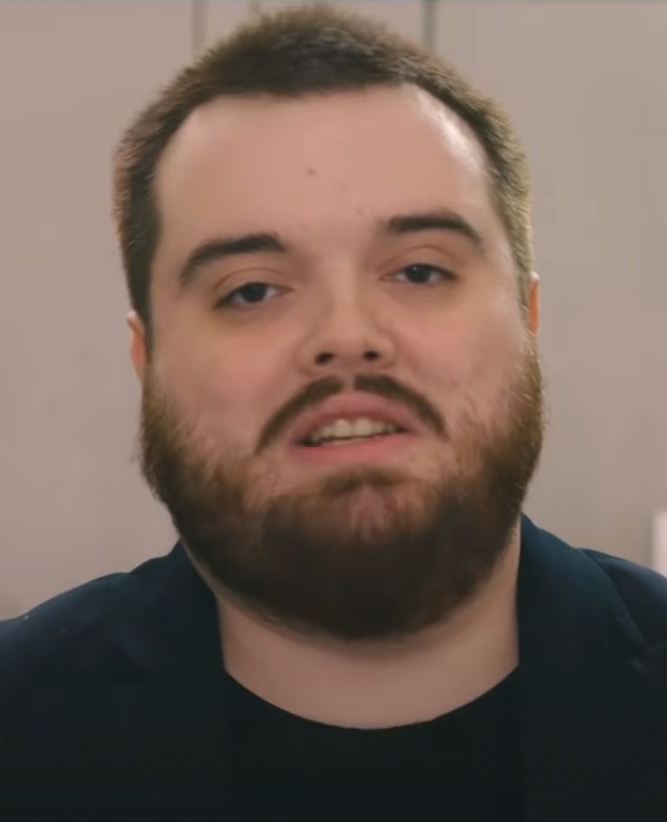
Ibai, winner of the International Award

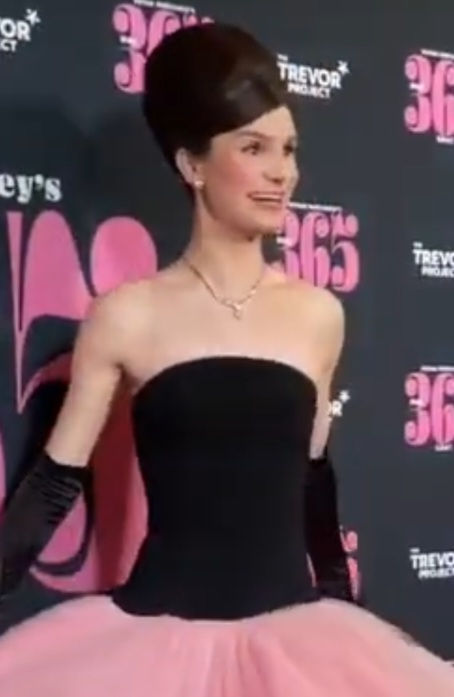
Dylan Mulvaney, winner of the Breakout Creator Award

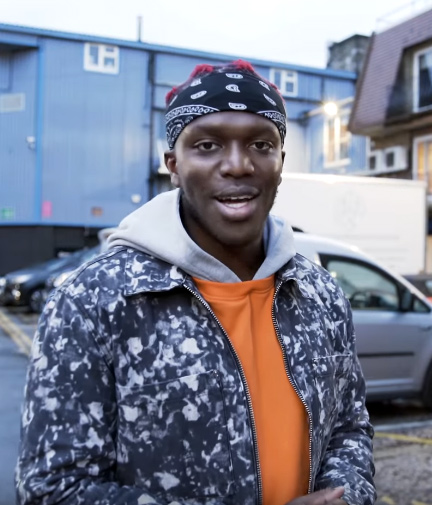
PRIME by KSI and Logan Paul, winner of the Creator Product Award

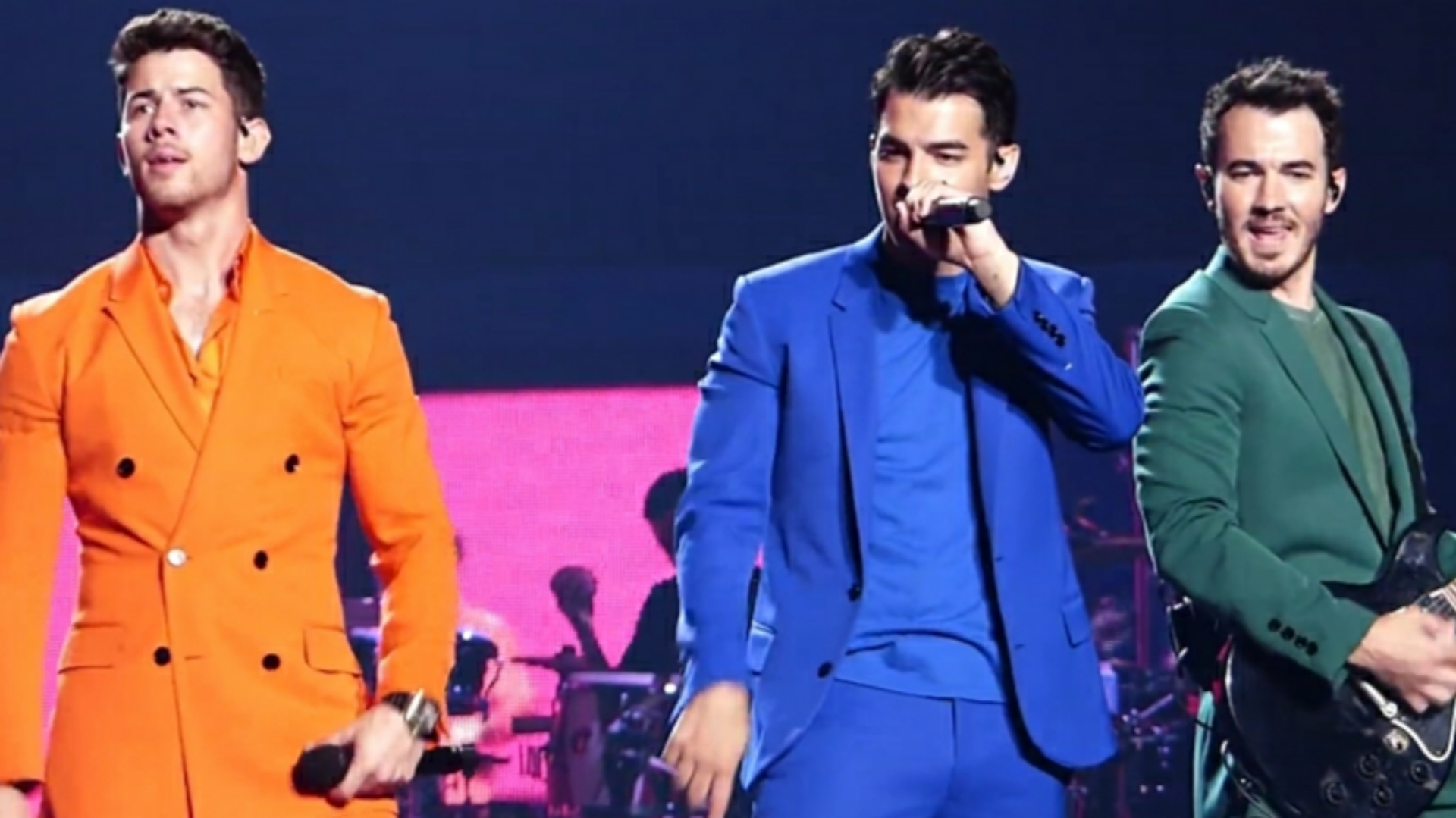
Jonas Brothers (Kevin, Joe, and Nick) win the Crossover Award

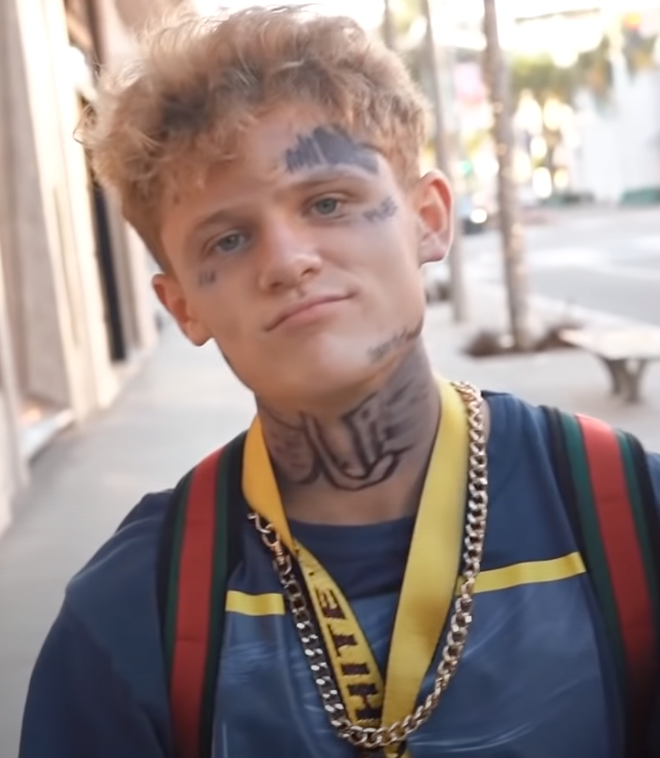
Ryan Trahan, winner of the First Person Award

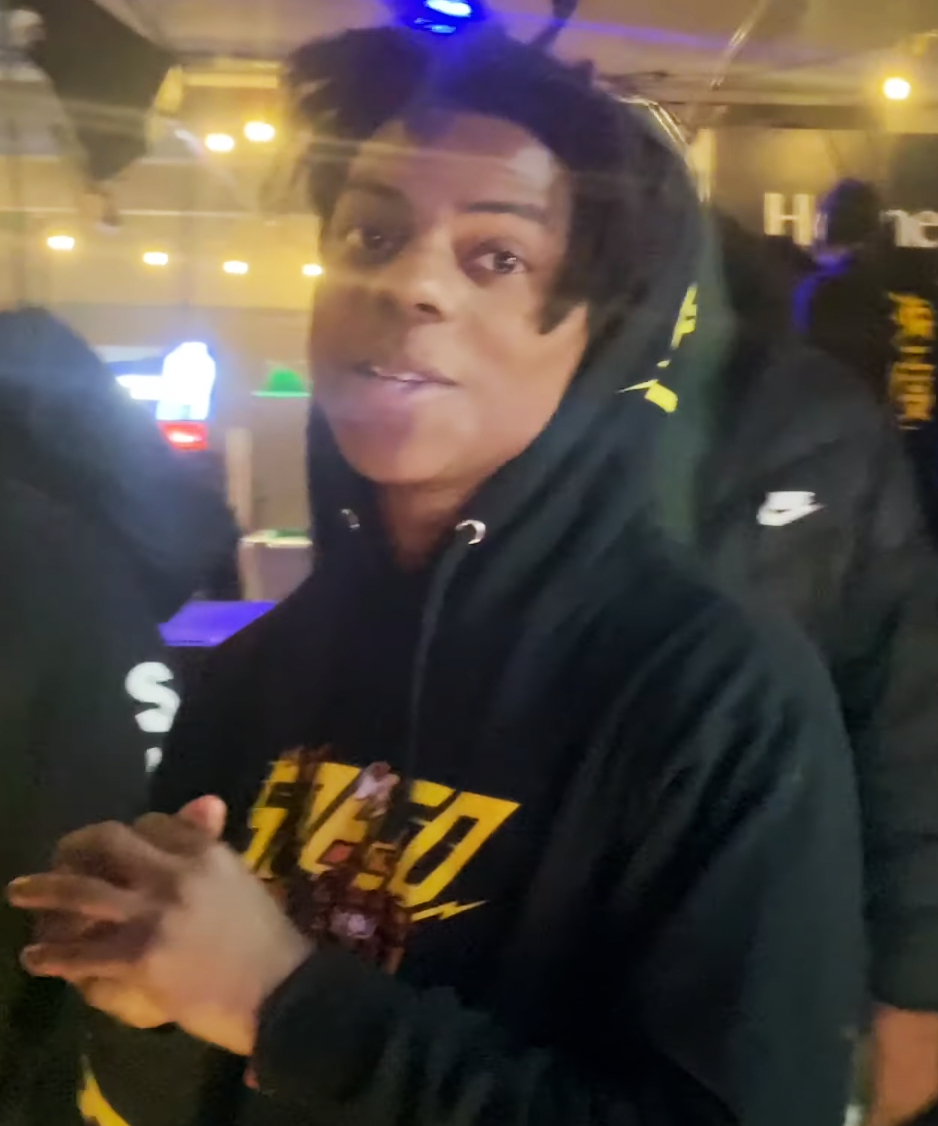
IShowSpeed, winner of the Variety Streamer Award

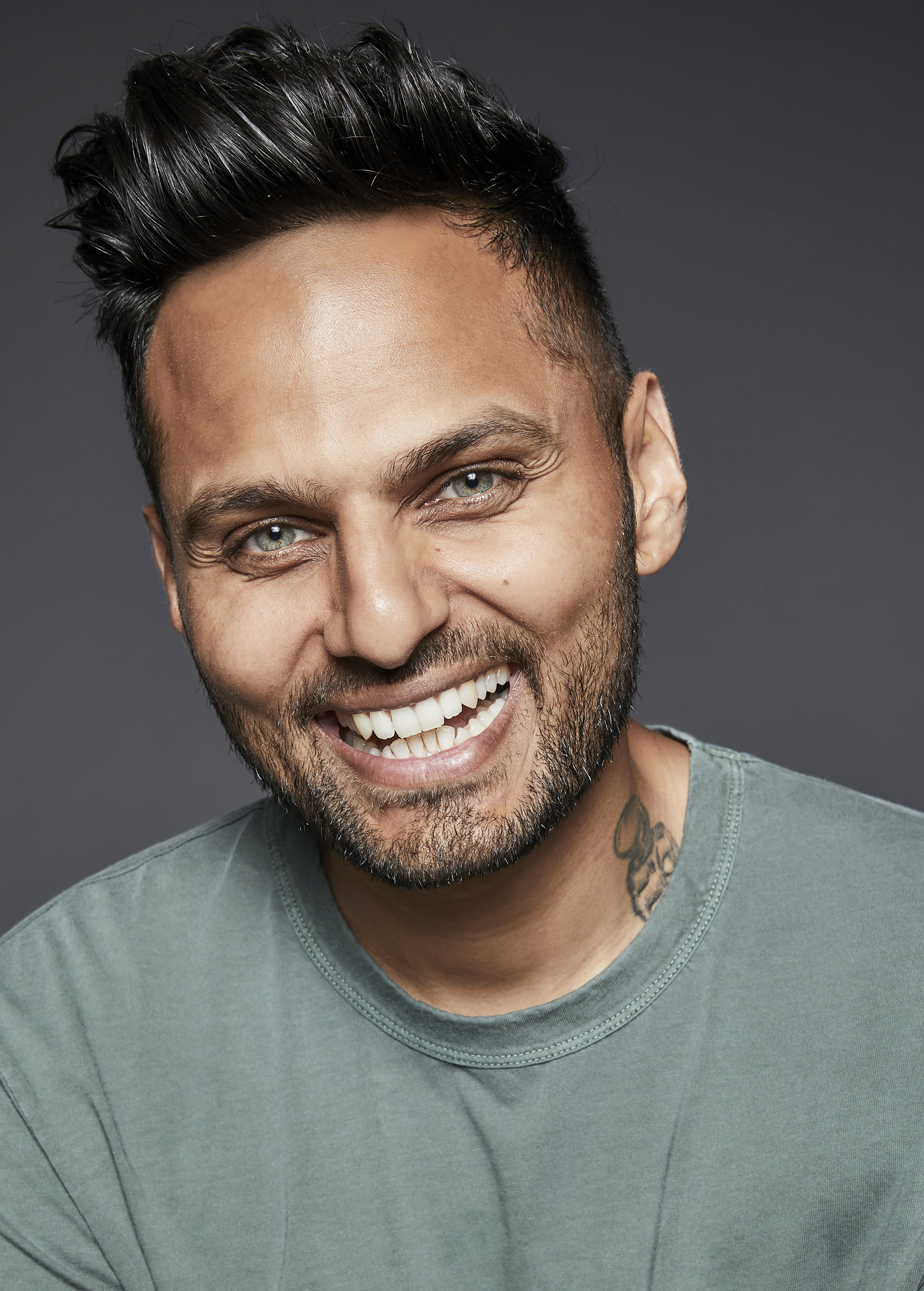
On Purpose with Jay Shetty, winner of the Podcast Award

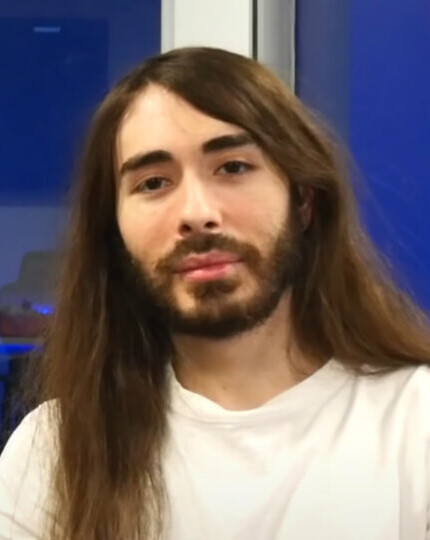
penguinz0, winner of the Commentary Award

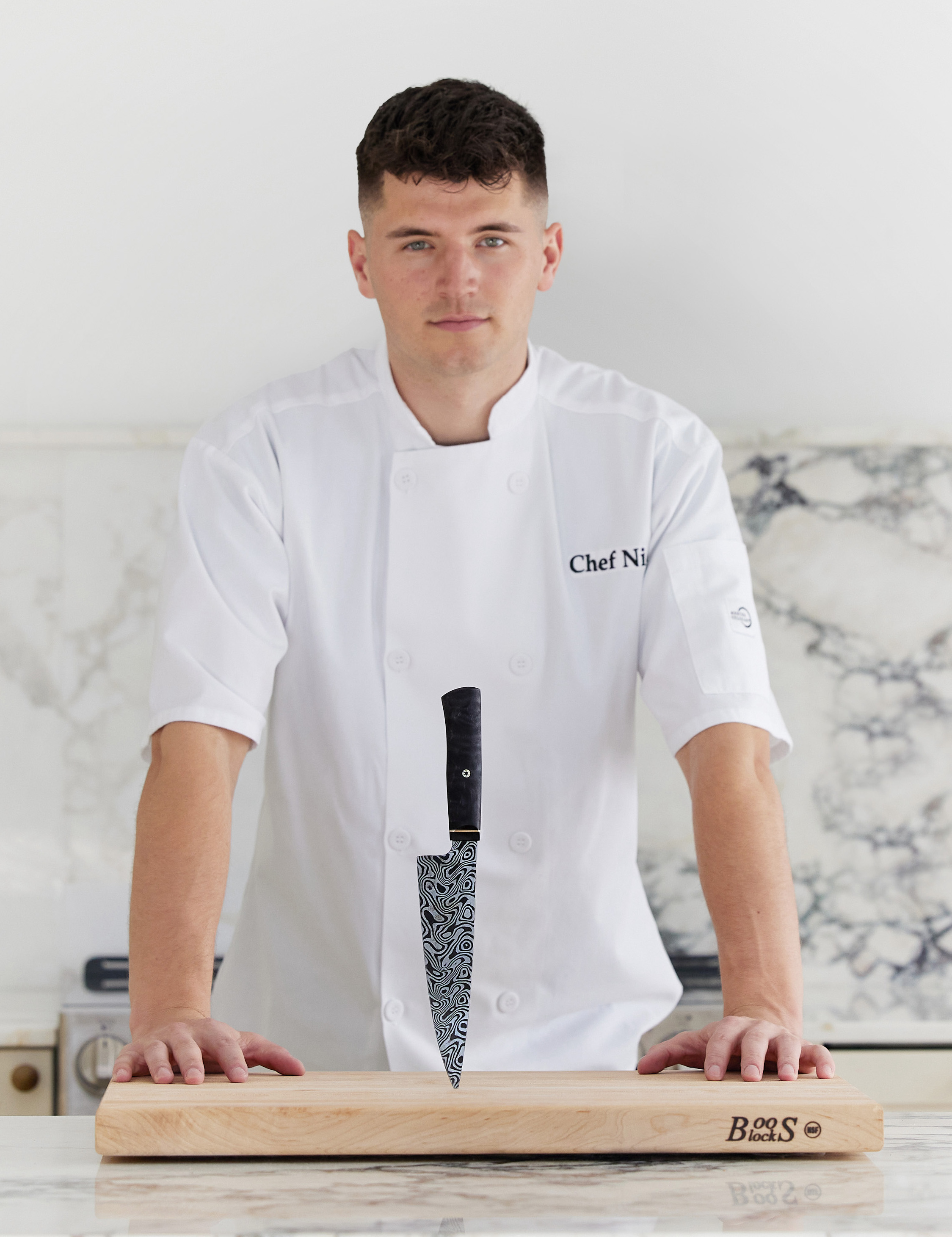
Nick DiGiovanni, winner of the Food Award

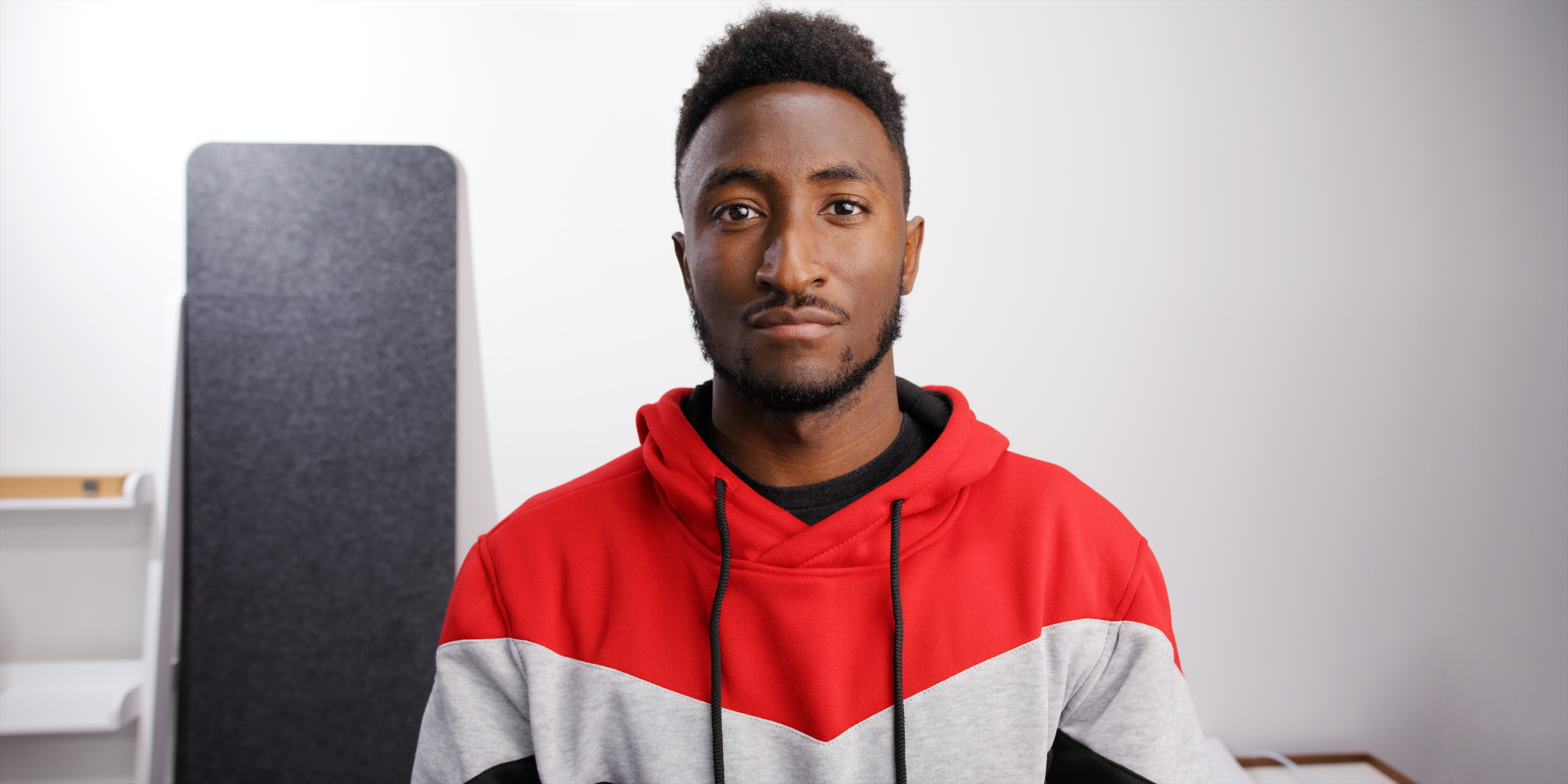
Marques Brownlee, winner of the Technology Award

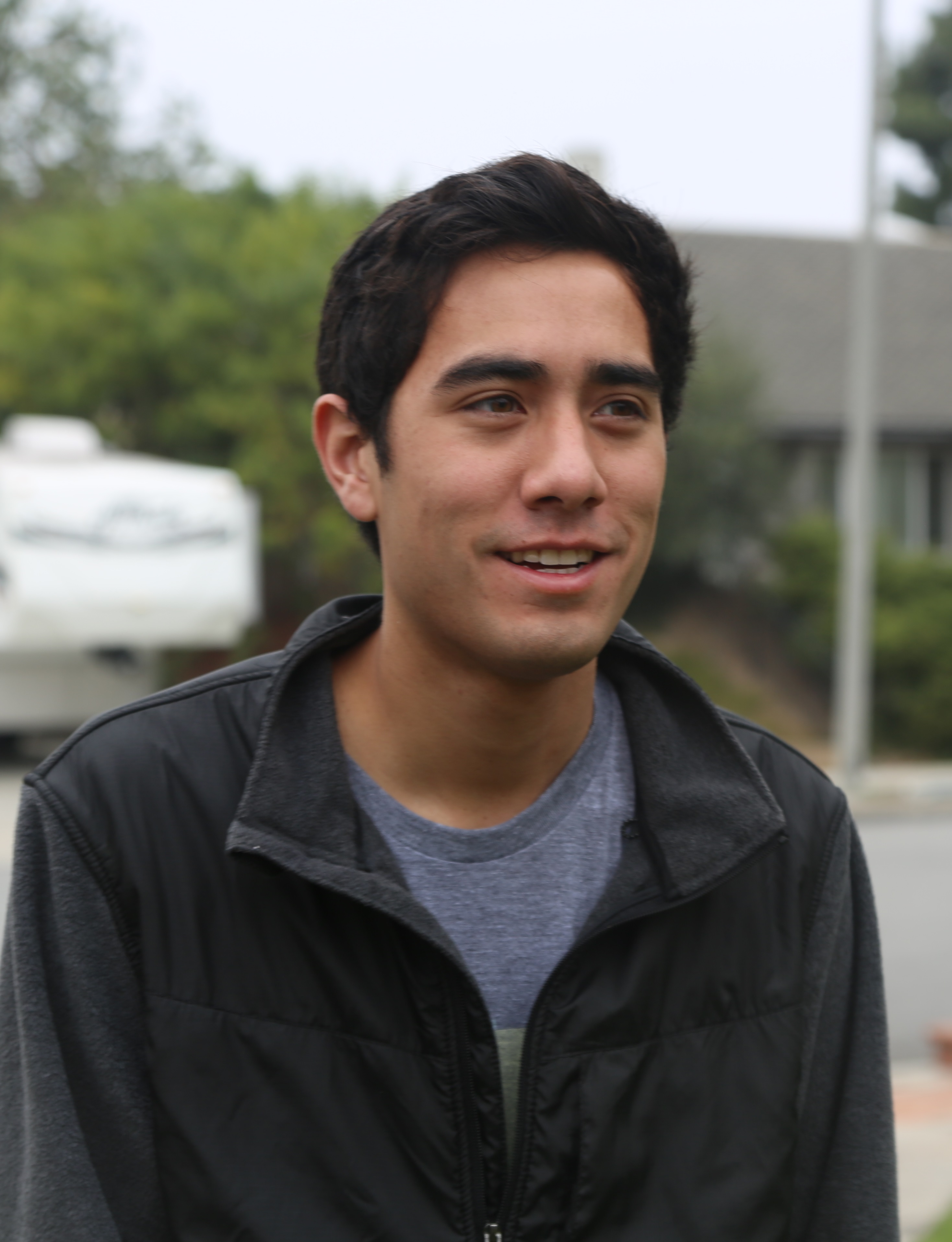
Zach King, winner of the Visual and Special Effects Award

Winners are listed first, in bold.

Overall Awards
Show of the Year	Creator of the Year
**Challenge Accepted (Michelle Khare)**; AMP; BRYCE (Brandon Rodgers); Chicken Shop Date (Amelia Dimoldenberg); Good Mythical Morning; Hot Ones (First We Feast); I spent a day with (Anthony Padilla); RDCWorld; Sam and Colby; UNHhhh (WOWPresents)	**MrBeast**; Airrack; Alix Earle; Charli D'Amelio; Jay Shetty; JiDion; Logan Paul; Mikayla Nogueira; Ryan Trahan; Zach King
Streamer of the Year	International
**Kai Cenat**; Emiru; HasanAbi; Ironmouse; IShowSpeed; Ludwig; Quackity; tarik; Valkyrae; xQc	**Ibai (Spain)**; Enaldinho (Brazil); Gaules (Brazil); Khaby Lame (Italy); Mikecrack (Spain)
Short Form	
**Chris Olsen**; The Cheeky Boyos; Connor Price; Elyse Myers; Rich Black Guy	
Individual Awards
Breakout Creator	Breakout Streamer
**Dylan Mulvaney**; Alix Earle; Drew Afualo; Jake Shane (octopusslover8); Keith Lee	**Fanum**; Agent00; ExtraEmily; Filian; Shylily
Collaboration	The Elevate Prize Get Loud Award for Social Good
**"Surprised he didn't pick rock every time" – MrBeast, Dwayne "The Rock" Johnson**; "Protein Burrito with The Big Man Chef Rush" – Albert CanCook, Chef Rush; "Quantum Computers, explained with MKBHD" – Cleo Abram, Marques Brownlee; "Japan Vlogs – Cooking with Lynja" – Nick DiGiovanni; "In this economy" – Haley Kalil, Jared Leto, Max Goodrich	**Invisible People**; Beast Philanthropy; DrLupo – St. Jude Children's Research Hospital; jacksepticeye – World Central Kitchen; MrBallen – MrBallen Foundation
Creator Product	Crossover
**Prime – Logan Paul x KSI**; BÉIS – Shay Mitchell; CrunchLabs – Mark Rober; Feastables – MrBeast; POPFLEX – Blogilates	**Jonas Brothers**; Hailey Rhode Bieber; Kate Hudson; Lili Reinhart, Camila Mendes, Madelaine Petsch (blondebrunetteredhead); Paris Hilton
First Person	Just Chatting
**Ryan Trahan**; Airrack; Benoftheweek; Danny Duncan; Safiya Nygaard	**Quackity**; HasanAbi; Kai Cenat; xQc; YourRAGE
Variety Streamer	VTuber
**IShowSpeed**; Emiru; LIRIK; Ludwig; Valkyrae	**Gawr Gura**; Filian; Ironmouse; Jaiden Animations; shxtou
Music Awards
Rolling Stone Sound of the Year
**"Made You Look" – Meghan Trainor**; "Boy's a liar Pt.2" – PinkPantheress, Ice Spice; "Here With Me" – d4vd; "Area Codes" – Kaliii; "GOATED." – Armani White; "In Ha Mood" – Ice Spice; "Players" – Coi Leray; "Pretty Girls Walk" – Big Boss Vette; "Unholy" – Sam Smith, Kim Petras; "What It Is" – Doechii
Show Awards
Scripted Series	Unscripted Series
**BRYCE (Brandon Rodgers)**; Dhar Mann; The Game Theorists; Ginormo! (Steven He); RDCWorld	**Sam and Colby**; Challenge Accepted (Michelle Khare); Chicken Shop Date (Amelia Dimoldenberg); Hot Ones (First We Feast); I spent a day with (Anthony Padilla)
Podcast	
**On Purpose with Jay Shetty**; Call Her Daddy; H3 Podcast; IMPAULSIVE; The Yard	
Subject Awards
Animated	Beauty
**Helluva Boss (VivziePop)**; Haminations; Jaiden Animations; The Land of Boggs; MeatCanyon	**Mikayla Nogueira**; Brad Mondo; colleen.makeupp; MissDarcei; NikkieTutorials
Comedy	Commentary
**RDCWorld**; DeMarcus Shawn; Kris Collins; Lucas Lopez; The McFarlands	**penguinz0**; Chad Chad; D'Angelo Wallace; Danny Gonzalez; Kurtis Conner
Competitive Gamer	Dance
**TenZ**; iiTzTimmy; Scump; tarik; Typical Gamer	**Énola Bédard**; Cale Brown; Matt Steffanina; Merrick Hanna; yoolwxnder
Fashion and Style	Food
**Wisdom Kaye**; Gunnar Deatherage; Kenz Lawrén; Max Alexander; Mina Le	**Nick DiGiovanni**; Alexis Nikole; Chef Reactions; Cooking With Lynja; Nigel Ng
Gamer	Health and Wellness
**Dream**; Aphmau; Caylus; Markiplier; TommyInnit	**Dr Julie**; Austen Alexander; Doctor Mike; HealthyGamerGG; LeanBeefPatty
Kids and Family	Learning and Education
**Ms. Rachel**; Brittikitty; Gracie's Corner; Rebecca Zamolo; Recess Therapy	**TierZoo**; Big Weird World; Colin and Samir; Tom Scott; Veritasium
Lifestyle	News
**AMP**; Bretman Rock; Charli D'Amelio; Kara and Nate; Sofia Richie Grainge	**HasanAbi**; Brian Tyler Cohen; Gay News Josh Helfgott; The Philip DeFranco Show; Task & Purpose
Science and Engineering	Sports
**I did a thing**; Allen Pan; Hacksmith Industries; Mark Rober; techjoyce	**Jesser**; Deestroying; Duke Dennis; Good Good; Olivia Dunne
Technology	
**Marques Brownlee**; iJustine; Linus Tech Tips; Mrwhosetheboss; Supercar Blondie	
Craft Awards
Cinematography	Editing
**Recider (Nicholas Adams)**; Ashley Xu; Cole Walliser; Lyrical Lemonade; Will Freeark	**Yes Theory (Thomas Dajer, Cam Peddle, Tristan Kevitch)**; Cooking With Lynja (Lynn Davis); Jet Lag: The Game (Sam Denby, Adam Chase, Ben Doyle); Kelly Wakasa (Kelly Wakasa, Wyatt Dobson); Savanah Moss
Visual and Special Effects	Writing
**Zach King**; Buttered Side Down; Corridor Crew (Sam Gorski, Niko Pueringer, Wren Weichman, Jordan Allen); Justin Yi; SoKrispyMedia	**Leo González**; CalebCity (Caleb Glass); Dami Lee; Josh Zilberberg; Petey (Peter Martin)

=== Brand Awards ===
Agency of the Year	Brand of the Year
**Reach Agency**; BENlabs; Content+; kvell; Whalar	**Barbie (Mattel)**; Chipotle Mexican Grill; Insta360; Old Spice (Procter & Gamble); Prime Video (Amazon)
Branded Series	Branded Video
**Live@4:25 (Totino's pizza rolls, the cheeky boyos, Flighthouse, Content+)**; A Style Is Born (Wayfair, Made in Network); Plot Pitch (Prime Video); Real People, Real Stories (AARP); Who Wore It Best (Netflix, Harry Jowsey)	**ASMcaR (Nissan, Donut)**; Give Odor The Bird (Old Spice, SypherPK, United Esports); My poor friend (Photoshop Express, beeveekee); Wait for it #corn (Chipotle Mexican Grill, chipotle); When u meet her dad and Old Spice saves the day (Old Spice, Adam W)
Influencer Campaign	Social Impact Campaign
**Blasting to the Top (Gel blaster, BENlabs)**; #heinzmasterz (Heinz, Whalar); Chainsaw Man Viewing Party (Chainsaw Man, Crunchyroll); DiGiorno Made Us Do It (DiGiorno, Reach Agency); Nebula (Standard)	**Play by the Rules (International Committee of the Red Cross, PopShorts)**; Barbie You Can Be Anything (Barbie, Mirrored Media); Loot for Good (Call of Duty Endowment, Activision); Real Recipes for Real Change (Chipotle, The Farmlink Project, Nick DiGiovanni); The ReTok Shop (Nature Valley, Content+)
Brand Engagement	
**Insta360 (No Drone? No Problem!)**; Dumb Ways to Die (PlaySide Studios); Feastables (MrBeast); Jersey Mike's (Subs for Subs, TSM); SweeTarts (SweeTarts Film Fest on TikTok, Content+)	
