= Caylus =

Caylus may refer to:

== People ==
=== Surname ===
- Anne Claude de Caylus (1692–1765), French archaeologist
- Charles de Tubières de Caylus (1698–1750), French naval officer, governor of Martinique
- Claude Abraham de Tubières de Grimoard de Pestel de Lévis, duc de Caylus (c. 1672–1759), French military leader
- Marquise de Caylus (1673–1729), French noblewoman and writer

=== Given name ===
- Caylus Cunningham (born 1997), American YouTuber

== Places ==
- Caylus, Tarn-et-Garonne, France

== Other ==
- Caylus (game), 2005 board game by William Attia
- House of Rougé, holding the duchy of Caylus and the title Duke of Caylus
