= Unsubscribe =

Unsubscribe may refer to:

- Unsubscribing from a mailing list, where an individual or an organization sends material to multiple recipients
- Unsubscribing from a subscription business model, where a customer must pay a subscription price to have access to a product or service
- Unsubscribe (film), a 2020 short film

== See also ==
- Opt-out
