= Max Alexander =

Max Alexander may refer to:

- Max Alexander (comedian) (1953–2016), American comedian and actor
- Max Alexander (boxer) (born 1981), American boxer
- Max Alexander (fashion designer) (born 2016), American fashion designer
- Max Alexander (journalist) (born 1957), American journalist
- Max Alexander (producer), American film producer who partnered with his brother Arthur Alexander
