= Unsubscribe (film) =

2020 horror film

- Theatrical release poster
- Directed by: Christian Nilsson
- Screenplay by: Christian Nilsson
- Produced by: Xiansson
- Starring: Charlie Tahan; Eric Tabach; Michelle Khare
- Music by: Hugo Lopez
- Production company: TXE
- Release date: June 10, 2020
- Running time: 29 minutes
- Country: United States
- Budget: $0
- Box office: $25,488

Unsubscribe is a 2020 horror film created by filmmaker Christian Nilsson and YouTuber Eric Tabach. It stars Tabach, Charlie Tahan and YouTuber Michelle Khare, and other successful YouTubers like Thomas Brag and Zach Kornfeld. The 29-minute film follows five famous YouTubers who are tricked into joining an online call, only to find themselves stalked and hunted by an internet troll on camera.

The film gained international publicity for earning a #1 spot in the worldwide box office and grossing US$25,488 on a $0 budget. This was achieved via a technique known as "four-walling", which allows filmmakers who rent out a whole theater to gain all of the profits from that film.

== Plot ==
Five YouTubers band together and conduct a video-call to celebrate their friend's birthday. When a mysterious user named Whitey (Charlie Tahan) suddenly appears in the meeting, the group begins to be stalked and terrorized by this enigmatic member of the call.

== Cast ==
- Eric Tabach as Eric
- Michelle Khare as Michelle
- Nicolas 'Nico' Kenn de Balinthazy as Sneako
- Tyler Brash as Tyler
- Zach Kornfeld as Zach
- Thomas Brag as Thomas
- Lauren Brodauf as Lauren
- Charlie Tahan as Whitey
- Garrett Kennell as Assassin

== Production ==
On May 7, 2020, Tabach called Nilsson to ask how he could potentially get one of his own YouTube videos to become the number one film in the U.S. box office. Nilsson explained "four-walling", the distribution technique where a filmmaker rents out an entire theater which allows them to keep all the profits. Because theaters were closed due to the COVID-19 pandemic, Nilsson predicted they'd be able to rent out a closed theater for very little money, buy every ticket themselves for several showings, then keep the profits—essentially, breaking even.

Nilsson knocked out the script for "Unsubscribe" in one day, and filming began Monday, May 11 with Tabach's friends and fellow YouTubers including Charlie Tahan (Ozark, I Am Legend), Michelle Khare (HBO Max's Karma), Zach Kornfeld (Try Guys), Thomas Brag (Yes Theory), Sneako, Tyler Brash, and Lauren Brodauf. A majority of the film was shot over Zoom in just three days.

On June 20, 2020, Nilsson and Tabach premiered the film at the Westhampton Beach Performing Arts Center in Westhampton Beach, NY. They bought out five showings and racked up $25,488 in ticket sales. The following day, the film was listed on Box Office Mojo and The Numbers as the number one film in the U.S. box office.

== Reception ==
The film garnered mostly positive reviews for its creation process and ability to gain high rankings during the COVID-19 pandemic. The Washington Post praised the film as "a testament to artistic ingenuity under lockdown", while NME called the film an "entertaining hoax", and Fox News opined that "garnering a No. 1 release – albeit short-lived since 'Unsubscribe' failed to throw off weekend box office numbers – is a stout accomplishment in itself". Other sources were more ambivalent, such as Decider, which stated that "[w]hether this stunt is a stroke of brilliance or a stroke of shameless self-promotion is up to you", while Trillmag said that "Unsubscribe's status as a historical filmmaking achievement is indicated by the unorthodox (and deviously scheming) method through which it achieved box office success".
