= Cleo Abram =

American video journalist (born 1993)

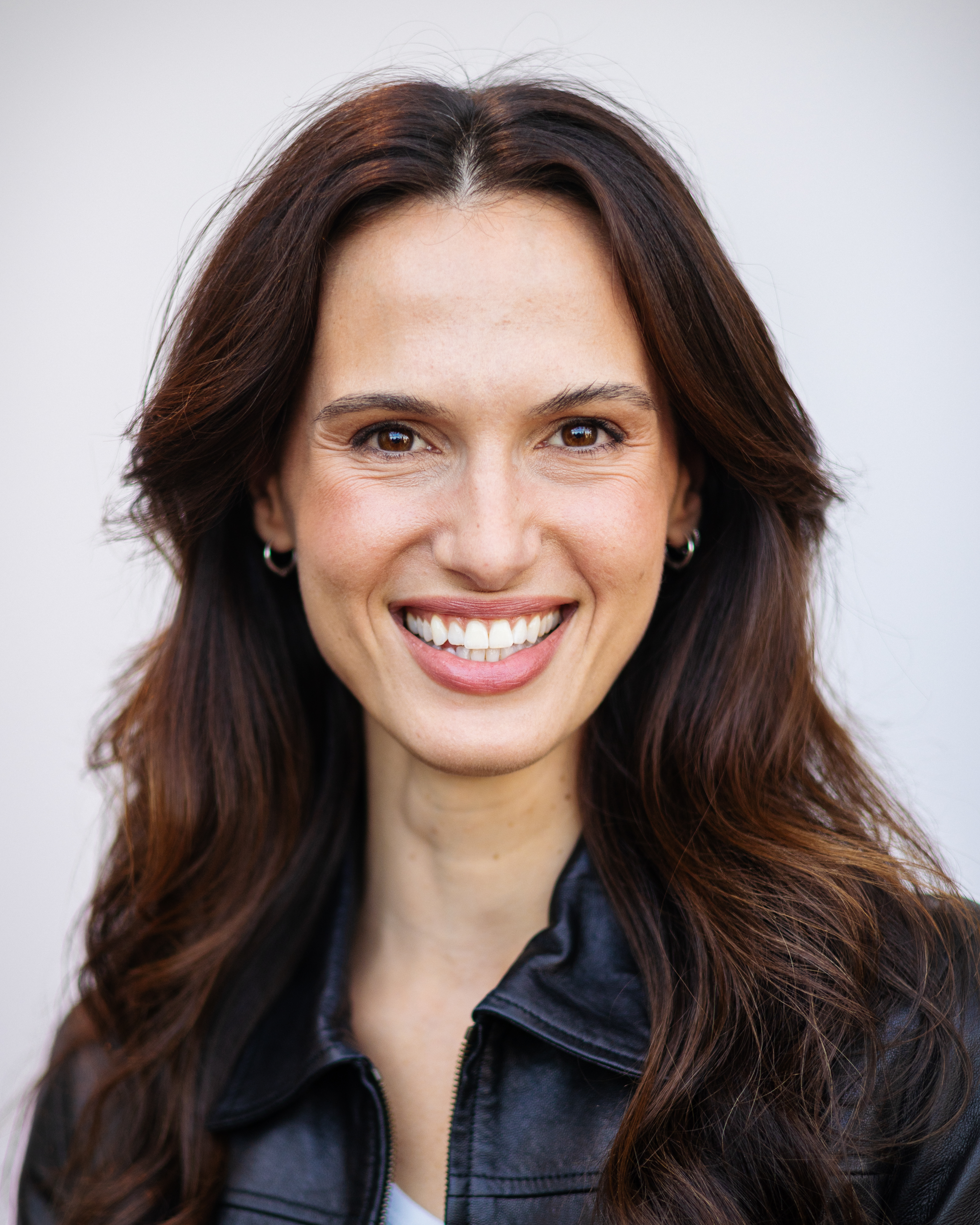
- Abram in 2025
- Born: Cleo Constantine Abram; January 25, 1993 (age 33); Washington, D.C.
- Education: Columbia University (B.A.)
- Occupations: Filmmaker; journalist; YouTuber
- Known for: Huge if True
- Spouse: Zachariah Reitano (m. 2021)

YouTube information
- Channel: Cleo Abram
- Years active: 2022 – Present
- Subscribers: 8.56 million
- Views: 2.79 billion
- Last updated: 3 July 2026

Cleo Constantine Abram (born January 25, 1993) is an American video journalist. She produced videos for Vox until 2022, when she launched her own YouTube channel, Huge if True, which covers emerging technologies. By June 2026, her channel had more than 8.1 million subscribers.

== Early life and education ==
Abram was born and raised in Washington, D.C. After graduating from Sidwell Friends School in 2011, she attended Columbia University, where she founded the school's TEDx conference and was a University Senator for the Columbia College Student Council. She graduated in 2015 with a Bachelor of Arts in political science. Abram is also a former model.

== Career ==
Abram founded the newsletter "The Short Version", which examines arguments on opposing sides of current issues. She produced videos for Vox about technology topics. She hosted the Vox Media Studios and YouTube Originals series Glad You Asked, which was nominated for an Emmy Award in 2020. In January 2022, she left Vox to start a YouTube channel with a series titled "Huge if True" about emerging technologies. In 2025, she was sponsored by Formula E racing to produce Evo Sessions documentaries on the science behind the competition. In 2025, she signed with the United Talent Agency.

== Awards and nominations ==
In October 2023, MakeUseOf.com included Abram's channel in their collection of eight best explainers on Youtube.

Abram was nominated at the 13th Streamy Awards for "Best Collaboration", with MKBHD.

== Personal life ==
Abram married Zachariah Reitano, the CEO and co-founder of the healthcare company Ro, in June 2021.
