= Michelle Khare =

American YouTuber (born 1992)

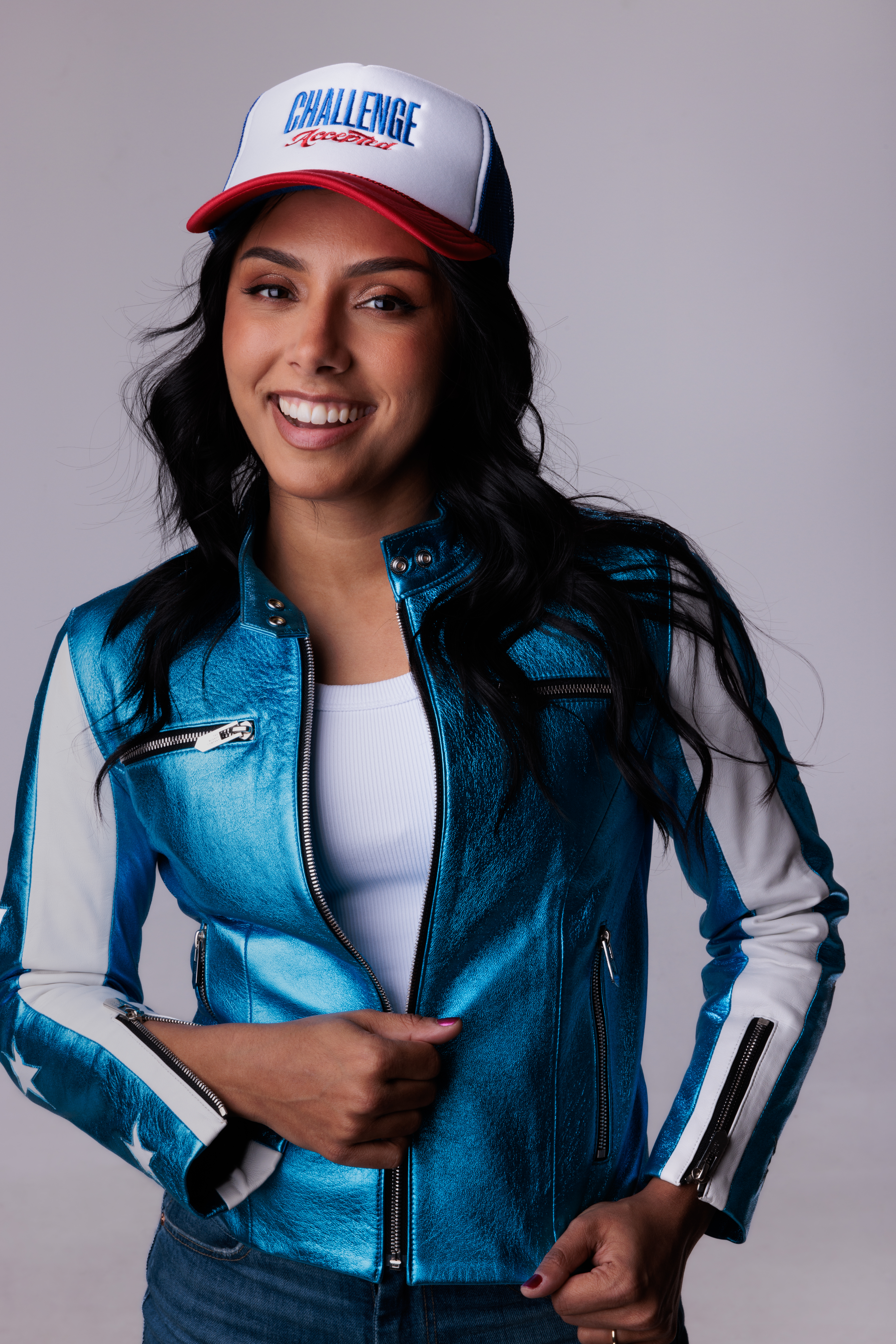
- Khare in 2026
- Born: Michelle Asha Khare; August 10, 1992 (age 34); Memphis, Tennessee, U.S.
- Education: Dartmouth College
- Occupations: YouTuber; actress; stunt performer; television host; cyclist
- Spouse: Garrett Kennell (m. 2022)

YouTube information
- Channel: Michelle Khare
- Years active: 2008–present
- Subscribers: 5.49 million
- Views: 919 million
- Last updated: 12 September 2026
- Website: michellekhare.com

Michelle Asha Khare (/kɑːˈreɪ/ kar-AY; born August 10, 1992) is an American YouTuber, television host, stunt performer, actress and former professional cyclist. She is the co-creator and host of the YouTube reality documentary series Challenge Accepted, and the host of the children's competition program Karma on HBO Max.

== Early life and career ==
Khare attended Dartmouth College, where she studied a self-designed major in digital media and technology. During her studies, she interned at several companies, including Google, DreamWorks Animation and Carousel Productions.

=== Cycling career ===
While living in Los Angeles for her internships, Khare began road and mountain cycling recreationally. She joined the Dartmouth Cycling Team and won the US U23 Criterium nationals in 2014. Khare joined the BMW Women's Professional Team, where she trained and raced professionally for the 2014–2015 season.

=== YouTube career ===
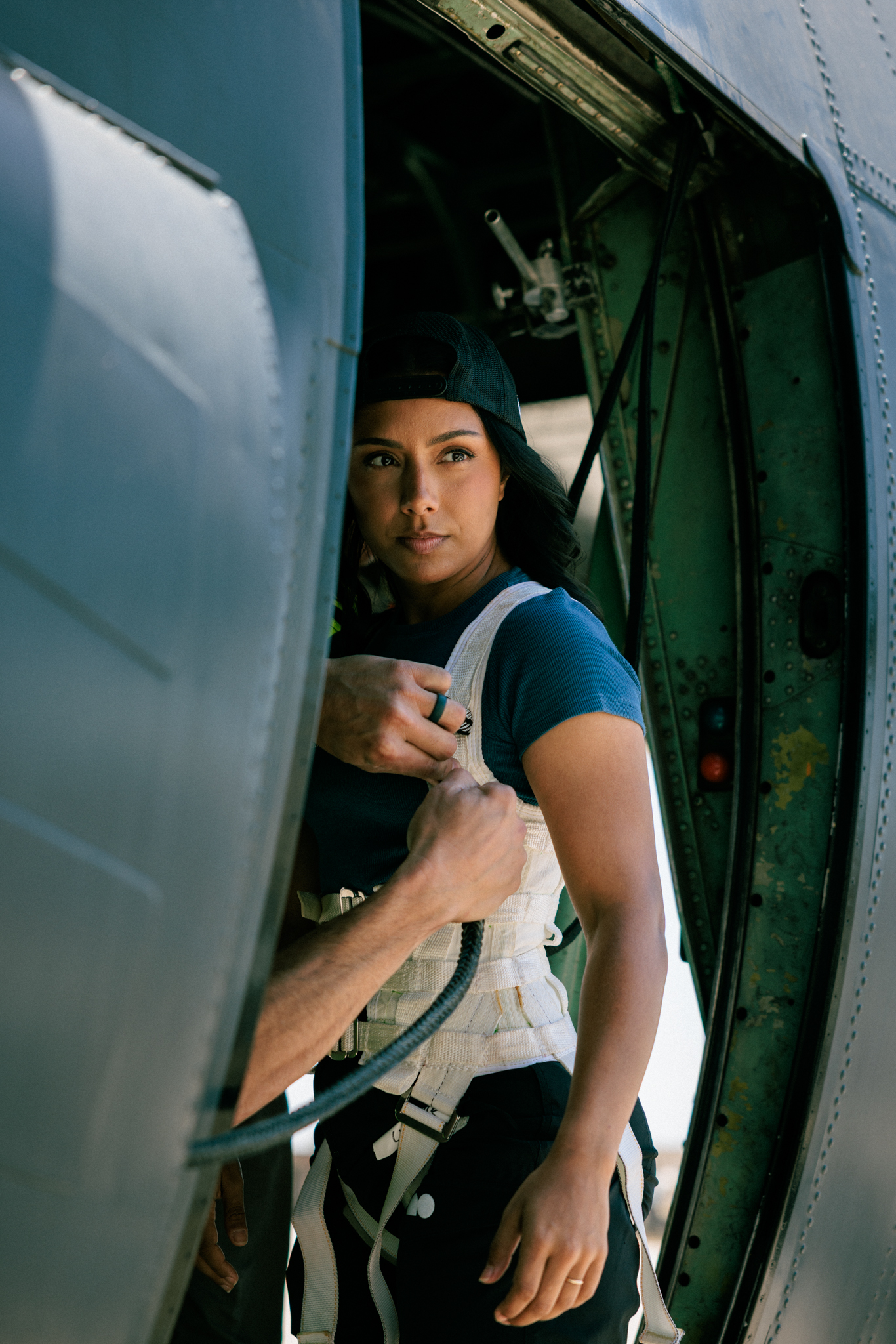
Khare in the YouTube video "I Tried Tom Cruise's Deadliest Stunt"

Khare credits her younger sister with inspiring her to start a YouTube channel. After graduating in 2014, Khare applied for an opening to be a full-time content producer at BuzzFeed. While Khare worked at BuzzFeed, there were heavy restrictions on content creators on their own channels because of potential conflict of interest, so her own channel remained dormant. While working at BuzzFeed, she continued her cycling career, creating content focusing on health and wellness. However, she eventually stopped cycling professionally in favor of creating Challenge Accepted, a reality documentary series on YouTube about taking on grueling physical challenges, such as attempting the NFL Scouting Combine, training as a professional dancer for a month and performing Harry Houdini's deadliest trick. When Khare left BuzzFeed in 2016, she refocused on uploading videos for her channel. Her channel had 2 million subscribers as of April 2020, and 4.18 million as of October 2023.

In April 2023, Khare won a boxing match against fellow YouTuber Andrea Botez in Creator Clash 2. In 2023 and 2025, Khare was a guest contestant on Season 8 and Season 15 of the YouTube and Nebula travel competition series Jet Lag: The Game.

=== Television career ===
Khare hosted Karma, a children's competition program that was released on HBO Max on June 18, 2020. In December 2024, Khare appeared as an anchor, meteorologist and field reporter in training on CBS8 San Diego.

== Personal life ==
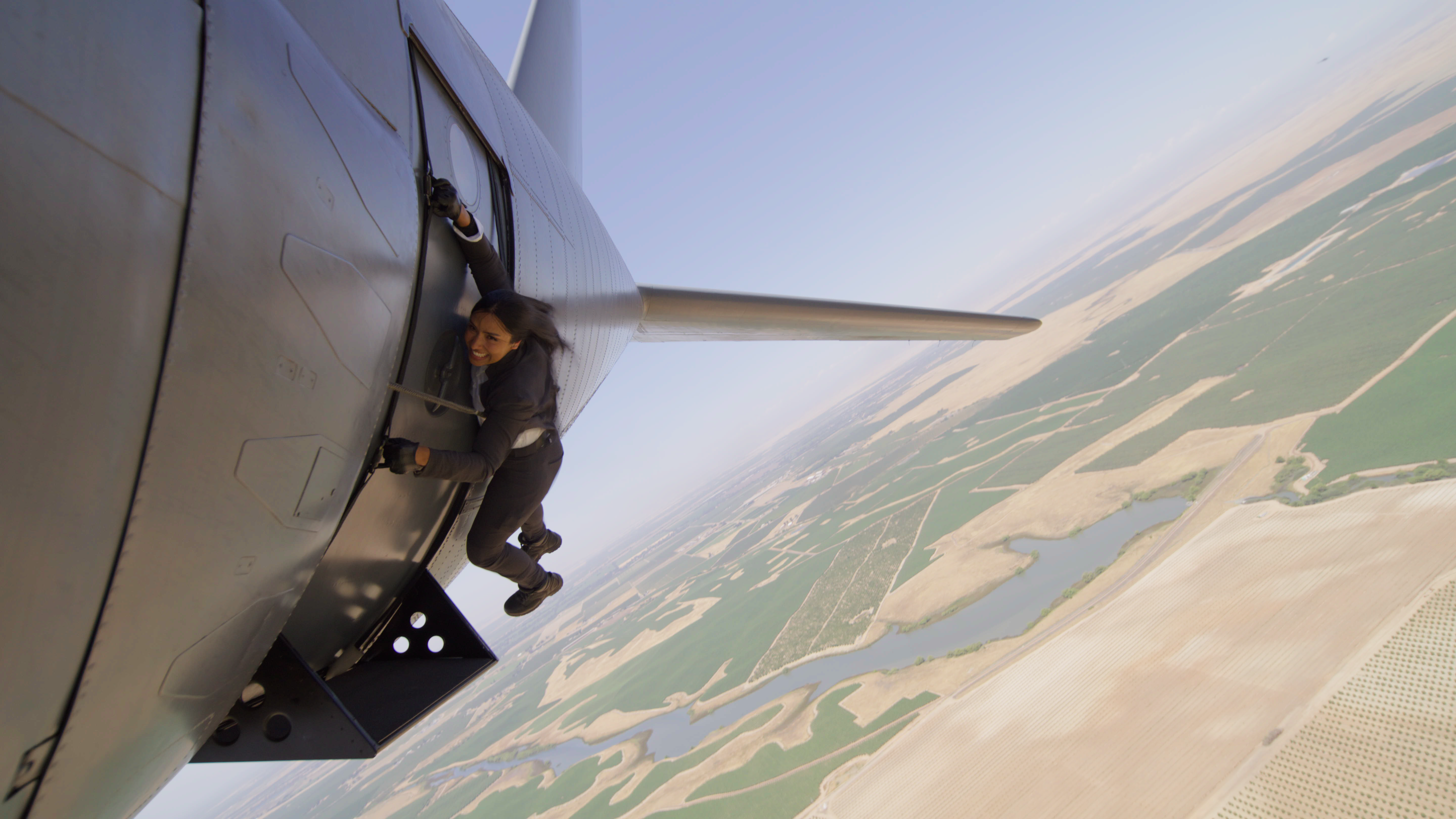
A still from the video where Khare is recreating a scene from the 2015 film Mission: Impossible – Rogue Nation by hanging off the side of a C130

Khare was born in Memphis, Tennessee. Her father, Vivek, is Indian-American and her mother, Laura, is of European descent.

She attended Caddo Magnet High School in Shreveport, where she fenced competitively and became Arkansas-Louisiana-Mississippi Cadet Foil champion. Khare married Garrett Kennell in October 2022. She is a black belt in taekwondo. (Note: "I Trained like a Samurai". Youtube.com.)

== Filmography ==
=== Film ===
Year	Title	Role	Notes
2012	The Shutdown	Interested Girl	Short film
2013	Reunion 108	Great Ass Woman	
2017	Whisper	Woman in Bed	Short film
2018	Everyone Loves Bulldog	Val	Short film
2020	Unsubscribe	Michelle	Short film
2022	Alma's Grave	Alma	Short film
2022	Jester Must Die	Callow	Short film
2023	Me, Myself and the Void	Comedian	

=== Television ===
Year	Title	Role	Notes
2018-present	Challenge Accepted	Herself	Web series; host and co-creator
2019	How to Survive a Break-Up	Jade	6 episodes
2020	Karma	Herself	Host; 8 episodes
2023, 2025	Jet Lag: The Game	Herself	Web series; guest competitor on seasons 8 and 15

== Awards and nominations ==
Year	Award	Category	Work	Result	Ref.
2019	11th Shorty Awards	YouTuber of the Year		Nominated	
2022	12th Streamy Awards	Show of the Year	Challenge Accepted	Nominated	
2022	12th Streamy Awards	Unscripted series	Challenge Accepted	Won	
2023	13th Streamy Awards	Show of the Year	Challenge Accepted	Won	
