= The McFarlands =

American family YouTube channel

- Education: University of Louisville
- Years active: 2019–present

Instagram information
- Page: The McFarlands
- Followers: 1.8 million

TikTok information
- Page: The McFarlands
- Followers: 4.4 million

YouTube information
- Channel: The McFarlands
- Genres: Comedy; skit
- Subscribers: 1.97 million
- Views: 1.39 billion
- Last updated: July 25, 2026
- Website: themcfarlands.family

The McFarlands are an American family YouTube channel from Louisville, Kentucky, made up of parents Dan and Kathy McFarland (both born 1960 or 1961) and sons Mitch, Colin (born 1993 or 1994), and Dylan (born 1995 or 1996). They are known for their comedic skits.

== Career ==
The McFarland children started out making home videos as children, with Mitch, the eldest, as the leader. They all attended St. Xavier High School and the University of Louisville. Colin and Dylan began making videos on Vine, later switching to TikTok and becoming known for their family-friendly skit videos. Mitch later moved to Nashville, Tennessee and occasionally cameos in videos; Colin, who worked in marketing, acts as the videographer, director, and editor for the videos and Dylan, who worked for Brown-Forman, handles the business aspects. Dan, the children's father, is typically the star of the videos. Before going full-time with content creation, the brothers worked a nine-to-five, going to their parents house after work to film until ten or eleven at night, leaving their fiancées alone.

In 2020, the family went viral from a teaching their father a dance set to the song "Blinding Lights". The video was later licensed for a fee by the Hospital for Special Surgery for an advertisement. In December 2022, the family signed with Creative Artists Agency. In 2025, the McFarlands started a podcast, The Backyard Chronicles.

== Awards and nominations ==
Year	Award	Category	Result	Ref.
2022	Streamy Awards	Comedy	Nominated	
2023	Streamy Awards	Comedy	Nominated	
