= TierZoo =

Web series and YouTube channel

YouTube information
- Channel: TierZoo
- Years active: 2017–present
- Genres: Education; science; zoology
- Subscribers: 3.94 million
- Views: 498 million
- Last updated: September 14, 2026

TierZoo is an educational web series and YouTube channel created and hosted by Patrick "Patch" Lacey. The series discusses animal-related topics such as wildlife ecology and evolutionary biology through a video gaming lens. It utilizes terminology and visuals that are prominent in video game culture and presents topics as if animals are players and the environments they live in are servers of the game "Outside".

The series launched on its eponymous YouTube channel in 2017, and also now streams on Nebula. As of July 2025, the channel has amassed over 3.8 million subscribers and 470 million views.

== Format ==
Many of Lacey's videos borrow terminology and visual themes found in video game culture. An example of this includes Lacey referring to animals as "builds". RuneScape, Overwatch, and Dark Souls are specific games which Lacey borrows text from, which he overlays on his videos. He also utilizes music and visual effects from Super Smash Bros., the Halo franchise, and Darkest Dungeon in his videos. The core structure of Lacey's videos has him place animals in a "tier list", a concept designed to subjectively rank in-game elements (such as characters) based on their viability respective to the list. Fighting games are particularly associated with tier lists, and Lacey credits the fighting game series Super Smash Bros. and its community with introducing him to the concept. Tier lists became a phenomenon on Twitch and YouTube in the mid- and late-2010s. He also uses visuals from animal documentaries in his videos.

== History ==
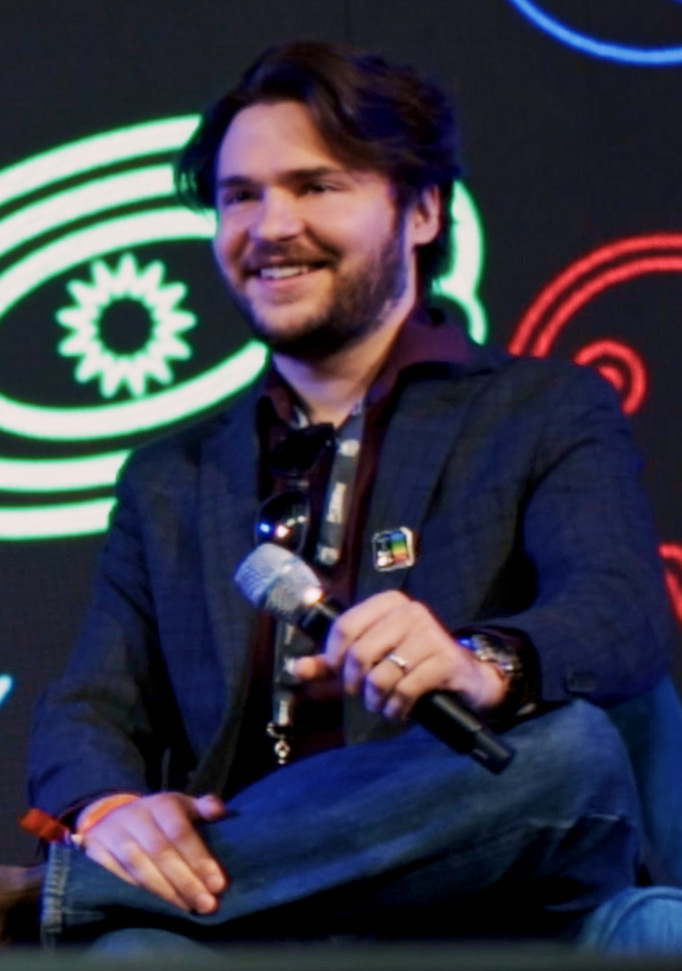
Patrick "Patch" Lacey at Open Sauce 2025

Lacey attended the University of Wisconsin–Madison, where he studied microbiology. He graduated in 2017 and shortly thereafter launched TierZoo on July 1. Lacey initially ran TierZoo as a side project while working as a food scientist for about a year before fully committing to TierZoo due to the channel's early success.

In April 2018, Kotaku covered TierZoo's "Earth's Worst Balance Patch" video which discussed dinosaurs and their extinction. Later that year, Lacey and many other science and education YouTube creators attended ThinkerCon in Alabama. In 2019, Lacey was featured in a PBS Eons video titled "Why Male Mammoths Lost the Game". The following year, he narrated an episode of Did You Know Gaming?. In October 2021, Lacey participated in the Team Seas fundraiser organized by MrBeast and Mark Rober.

Despite finding success with his pivot to full-time content creation, Lacey was denied the ability to rent an apartment as the landlord did not see his TierZoo venture as legitimate. However, his online success with TierZoo allowed him to have a sponsorship deal with Karat, a fintech credit card company, which issues credit cards exclusive to content creators.

TierZoo won the Streamy Award in the "Learning and Education" category in 2023.
