= Chef Reactions =

American social media personality

- Born: 1982 or 1983 (age 43–44); United States
- Years active: 2022–present

Instagram information
- Page: Chef Reactions
- Followers: 2.3 million

TikTok information
- Page: Chef Reactions
- Followers: 3.7 million

YouTube information
- Channel: Chef Reactions
- Genres: Food; reaction
- Subscribers: 313 thousand
- Views: 121.9 million
- Last updated: July 21, 2026

Chef Reactions (born 1982 or 1983) is an American social media personality known for his short-form videos in which he sardonically reacts to and critiques cooking by other creators. He is a classically-trained chef, but has kept his real name and workplace private.

== Biography ==
Chef Reactions was born in 1982 or 1983. Prior to creating his TikTok account in May 2022, he worked as a chef for nearly twenty years. He first got into social media after one of the dishwashers who worked for him uploaded a viral video, which Chef Reactions stated was "maybe the dumbest thing I've ever seen in my life." He thought that he could go viral as well and created his first video, a three-second clip of him ridiculing a piece of butt-shaped dough. He began to make more videos during his work breaks while working the night shift.

Chef Reactions was permanently banned from TikTok in 2022 for disobeying community guidelines, but was able to repeal the ban and revive his account. In April 2023, he signed with WME Group. That year, he had also quit his job to create content full-time and to take care of his grandmother, additionally making money through brand deals, merchandise, and Patreon.

== Content ==
In his videos, Chef Reactions typically reacts to videos of bizarre foods authentically and without a script. He is known for his sarcastic demeanor accompanied by his deep, monotone voice, blank expression, and use of swears. At the end of the video, he rates the dish on a scale of ten and states whether he would eat it or not. Due to the critical nature of Chef Reactions' videos, he has been accused of bullying, although he says that most of the videos he judges "are purposely made for shock value" and that he had a pet peeve for wasted food. He is credited with causing food creators to make more rage-bait recipes specifically for other creators to react to. When he travels, he asks viewers for suggestions of restaurants or places to review.

Chef Reactions fiercely protects his real name and identity; he claims that he receives death threats daily. As of May 2023, he had been recognized in public three times.

== Awards and nominations ==
Year	Award	Category	Result	Ref.
2023	Streamy Awards	Food	Nominated	
