= Albert CanCook =

Belarusian-born American chef and content creator (born 8 March 1988)

Albert Cancook
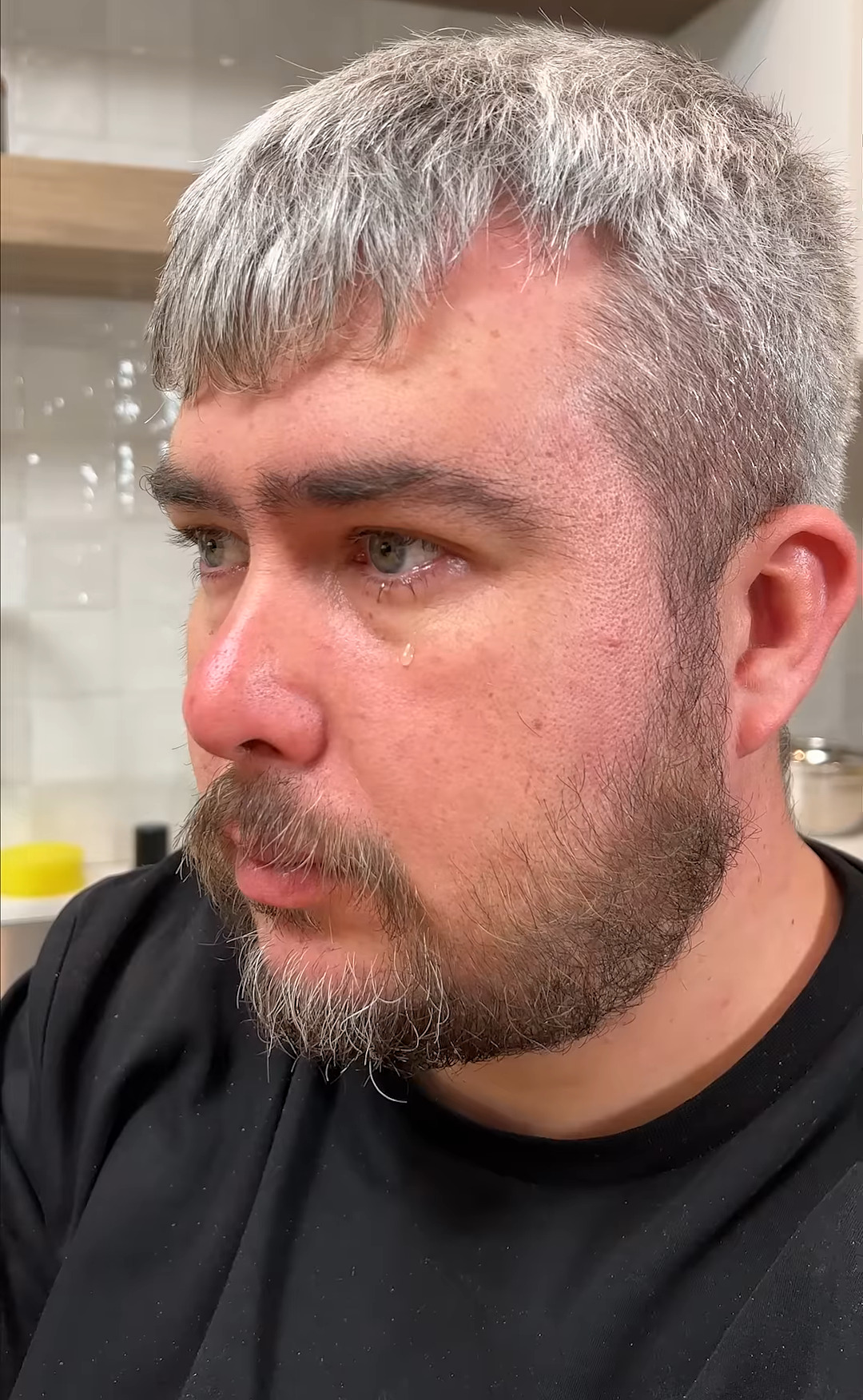
- Albert Cancook in 2023
- Born: Albert Niazhvinski; March 8, 1988 (age 38); Minsk, Belarusian SSR, Soviet Union
- Years active: 2015–present
- Works: Chef; online personality; author
- Height: 181 cm (5 ft 11 in)

TikTok information
- Page: albert_cancook
- Followers: 15.8 million

YouTube information
- Channels: albert_cancook; albert_cancook
- Years active: 2021–present
- Genres: vlog; comedy
- Subscribers: 29.3 million
- Views: 28.5 billion
- Last updated: October, 7 2026

Albert Niazhvinski (Belarusian: Альберт Няжвінскі born 1988), better known by his online alias Albert CanCook, is a Belarusian-born American chef, food content creator, and cookbook author. He is best known for his high-energy short-form cooking content videos that remix classic comfort foods and pop-culture dishes, amassing over 50 million followers across social platforms, as of 2025. Niazhvinski has been featured in Business Insider, Newsweek and Foodbeast, amongst others.

== Early life and background ==
Niazhvinski was born in Minsk, Soviet Union, and grew up with an early interest in food and design. After attending Belarusian State University of Informatics and Radioelectronics, he moved to the United States to work in engineering and product design before turning to cooking full-time.

== Career ==
Niazhvinski began posting cooking videos online in 2020, focusing on recreating meals depicted in animated films and classic television shows. His breakout came after he reimagined the "cheesy pizza" from A Goofy Movie, which attracted coverage from Newsweek and In The Know. In 2021, he was profiled by Tubefilter in its “Creators on the Rise” series, which documented his transition from hobbyist to full-time food creator. His culinary content attracted millions of followers across multiple platforms. His Eastern European heritage showed through his dishes, and by 2023, Niazhvinski's content had a European reach, including features in European outlets such as Guide Me Malta, Lovin Malta, Malta Daily and Men Today for his viral reinterpretations of regional dishes.

In 2024, Niazhvinski joined the new culinary division of Underscore Talent. The same year, he published his first cookbook, Albert Can Cook, through Penguin Random House. The cookbook compiled his most popular online recipes alongside new material emphasizing simple, home-style cooking, and the book's publication coincided with his inclusion in The Nation’s coverage of The Rise of Influencer Chefs and a listing by Favikon among the top food influencers of 2024.

His work has also been featured by outlets including Foodbeast, Business Insider, The Nation and Newsweek, amongst others.

== Bibliography ==
- Albert Can Cook: How To Cook Viral Recipes Penguin Random House, 2024. ISBN 9780744091267.
