= Waterpark Simulator =

2025 management video game

- Developer: CayPlay Studios
- Publisher: CayPlay Studios
- Engine: Unity
- Platforms: Windows; PlayStation 5 Xbox Series X and Series S
- Release: Early Access: August 22, 2025; Full Release: July 31, 2026
- Genre: Management simulator
- Mode: Single-player Multi-player

Waterpark Simulator is a 2025 first-person management simulator developed and published by Los Angeles-based team CayPlay Studios. The game focuses around managing an abandoned waterpark and getting up to five stars. It was released in early access for Windows on August 22, 2025, with the full game released on Windows, PlayStation 5, and Xbox Series X and Series S on July 31, 2026.

== Gameplay ==
The player starts off with an abandoned waterpark and needs to repair it using in game tools such as a hammer. Players can spend money to buy different attractions such as pools, water slides, diving boards, and more, and can level up and earn ratings. Over time, the player can hire employees and expand to new areas to expand their waterpark. The player can advertise their waterpark throughout the map, bringing more customers in. Players may also have the ability to sell food in food stands. Various foods such as hot dogs and ice cream can be sold to customers.

== Release ==
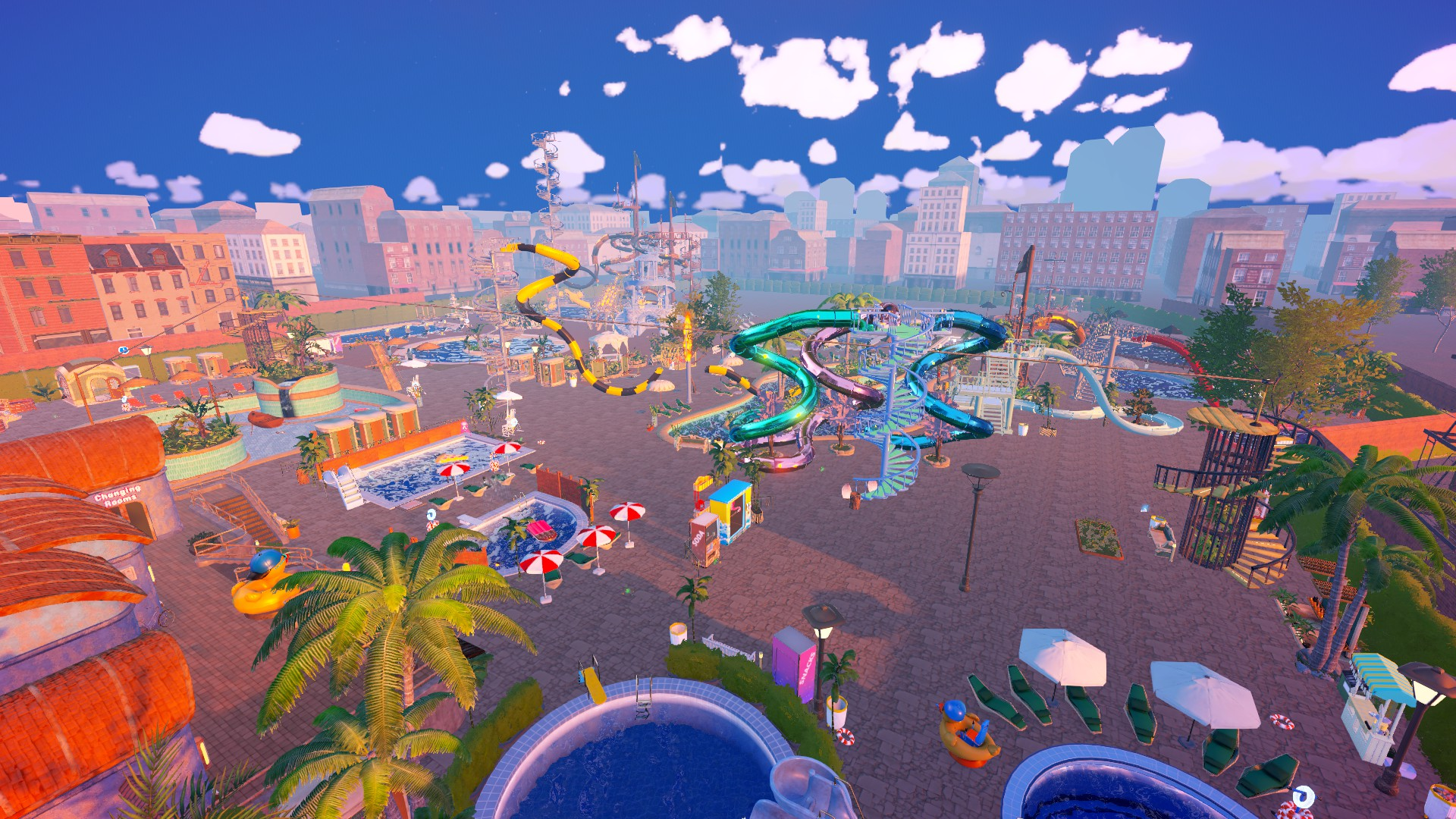
The game includes features like intricate slides, large pools, concession stands, vending machines and decorations.

A reveal trailer was released in May, along with an announcement of a demo. The demo released in June 2025 for Windows. A launch trailer was released onto YouTube on August 22, 2025 with the game releasing in early access on the same day. The game was fully release after the 1.0 update released on July 31, 2026, with ports on PlayStation 5 and Xbox Series X and Series S launching the same day.
