= Challenge Accepted (web series) =

American YouTube docuseries

- Genre: Reality; Documentary; Stunt show
- Created by: Michelle Khare; Garrett Kennell
- Directed by: Garrett Kennell
- Presented by: Michelle Khare
- Country of origin: United States
- Original language: English
- No. of episodes: 68

Production
- Running time: 15–75 minutes

Original release
- Network: YouTube
- Release: May 1, 2018 – present

Challenge Accepted is an American reality documentary web series created by Michelle Khare and Garrett Kennell for YouTube. Each episode of the show is hosted by Khare, who takes on intense physical and mental challenges with various field professionals.

Premiering on YouTube in May 2018, over 68 episodes of Challenge Accepted have been released. The show won a Streamy Award in 2022, and again in 2023.

== Format ==
Each episode of Challenge Accepted involves Michelle Khare training with real-world experts from the featured field, often undergoing the same physical and psychological challenges as full-time professionals. Episodes typically include interviews with the field experts, physical conditioning and behind-the-scenes insight into careers that are often inaccessible to the general public.

== Development ==
Challenge Accepted began as a personal creative endeavor led by Khare and Garrett Kennell. The early episodes were often conceptualized through brainstorming sessions centered around Khare’s personal fears and challenges, using prompts such as “What are Michelle’s biggest fears?” and “What’s a unique situation to face them head-on?” Said ideas were then shaped into transformational narratives. As the show gained popularity, the production quality increased with the addition of a small team from both traditional and digital media backgrounds.

== Episodes ==
No.	Title	Original release year
1	I Trained Like A Victoria’s Secret Model for 5 Weeks	2018
2	I Trained Like A Pop Star For 60 Days	2019
3	I Learned How To Voice A Cartoon	2019
4	I Learned How To Cook Like A Professional Chef	2019
5	I Trained Like Miss USA For 60 Days (PART 1)	2019
6	I Competed In A Beauty Pageant For The First Time (PART 2)	2019
7	I Tried Marine Bootcamp	2019
8	I Tried To Become A Runway Model at 5’2”	2019
9	I Learned Hollywood Motion Capture	2019
10	I Trained Like A Disney Princess	2019
11	I Trained Like A Ballerina For 6 Weeks	2019
12	I Trained like a NASA Astronaut	2020
13	I Joined A Clowning Troupe	2020
14	I Tried Police Academy	2020
15	I Trained Like An Olympic Figure Skater	2020
16	I Trained Like A Broadway Star For 6 Weeks	2020
17	I Tried Fire Academy	2020
18	I Tried FBI Academy	2020
19	I Became A Network TV Show Host	2021
20	The Proposal	2020
21	I Trained Like A Professional Gamer	2021
22	I Tried Parkour	2021
23	I Tried Lifeguard Academy	2021
24	I Climbed An 85ft Cliff With Only 1 Week of Training	2021
25	I Tried Professional Paintball	2022
26	I Tried Learning A Backflip in 24 Hours	2022
27	I Tried Paramedic Academy	2022
28	I Trained Like A Chess Grandmaster	2022
29	I Tried The Navy SEAL Fitness Test	2022
30	I Tried Solving A Rubik’s Cube In Under 60 Seconds	2022
31	I Trained Like An NFL Player	2022
32	I Tried Etiquette School	2022
33	I Tried 911 Dispatch	2022
34	I Tried SWAT Academy	2022
35	I Tried The Army	2023
36	I Tried Flight Attendant Academy	2023
37	I Joined The #1 Cheer Team In America	2023
38	I Ran A Marathon In The Hottest Place On Earth	2023
39	I Tried Secret Service Academy	2023
40	I Tried Planning My Wedding In A Week	2023
41	I Tried 100 Wedding Dresses	2023
42	I Tried Garbage Collection	2023
43	I Trained Like An Olympic Boxer	2024
44	I Tried Butler Academy	2024
45	I Tried CSI Academy	2024
46	I Tried Delivering A Baby	2024
47	I Joined A Traveling Circus	2024
48	We Tried 17th Century Sailing	2024
49	I Tried Santa School	2024
50	I Tried Houdini's Deadliest Trick	2024
51	I Tried Bomb Squad	2024
52	I Tried A Nuclear War Simulation	2024
53	I Tried Air Traffic Control	2024
54	I Tried FBI Hostage Negotiation	2024
55	I Trained Like A Black Belt For 90 Days	2024
56	I Tried Formula 1	2025
57	I Tried Defending A Murder Trial	2025
58	I Tried Anchoring The Local News	2025
59	I Worked at Disney's Secret Lab	2025
60	I Surprised Tom Cruise at his own Premiere	2025
61	I Trained Like A Samurai	2025
62	I Tried Tom Cruise's Deadliest Stunt	2025
63	I Worked at a Billionaire Hotel	2026
64	I Worked a $1 vs $1000 Restaurant	2026
65	I Ran 7 Marathons in 7 Days on 7 Continents	2026
66	I Ran 7 Marathons in 7 Days on 7 Continents - Ep 2	2026
67	I Ran 7 Marathons in 7 Days on 7 Continents - Finale	2026
68	I Tried Working an Emergency Room	2026

== Awards and nominations ==
Challenge Accepted won the Streamy Award for Best Unscripted Series in 2022 and the Streamy Award for Show of the Year in 2023, after being nominated for the latter award the previous year.

In 2025, Khare successfully petitioned to have Challenge Accepted join the Primetime Emmy Awards ballot for Outstanding Hosted Nonfiction Series or Special. The series premiered its first feature-length episode, Challenge Accepted: 90 Day Black Belt, at the Montclair Film Festival. It was the official Emmy submission for consideration by voting members.

== See also ==
- List of YouTube original programming
