= Infinite (YouTuber) =

American YouTuber (born 1997)

- Born: Caylus Quin Cunningham; August 18, 1997 (age 29); Spokane Valley, Washington, U.S.
- Years active: 2015–present

YouTube information
- Channels: Caylus; Infinite; CaylusBlox
- Genres: Gaming; reaction
- Subscribers: 20.3 million (main channel); 25.6 million (Infinite); 10.3 million (CaylusBlox)
- Views: 8.36 billion (main channel); 6.46 billion (Infinite); 2.67 billion (CaylusBlox)
- Last updated: February 6, 2026
- Website: shopcaylus.com

Caylus Quin Cunningham (born August 18, 1997), also known mononymously as Caylus or Infinite, is an American YouTuber. He is known for his reaction and gaming content on his YouTube channels.

== Early life ==
Caylus Quin Cunningham was born on August 18, 1997, in Spokane Valley, Washington.

== Career ==
Cunningham began to upload videos to YouTube in 2015, originally just for fun, making comedy videos with his friends and family. In September 2015, he uploaded a compilation of him bottle flipping after he could not find any online, which went viral. At the end of 2016, he rebranded his channel to "Infinite Lists" and tried to go viral purposefully, which ended up working better than he thought. At the start of his YouTube career, he balanced it as a side hustle along with his main job at Papa Murphy's.

In 2018, Cunningham signed with BroadbandTV Corp. He moved to Los Angeles later that year to collaborate with more YouTubers. In 2020, he began to upload more gaming-related videos, enjoying them more than reaction ones. In 2025, CayPlay Studios, a game developer cofounded by Cunningham, released Waterpark Simulator. He was later ranked #2 on the end-of-the-year top creator list by YouTube, only trailing MrBeast.

== Personal life ==
Cunningham enjoys golf and has filmed some videos involving it.

== Awards and nominations ==
Year	Award	Category	Result	Ref.
2023	Streamy Awards	Gamer	Nominated	
