= Yes Theory =

American YouTube channel

- Other names: Project 30; Generation Y Not

YouTube information
- Channel: YesTheory
- Years active: 2015–present
- Genres: Comedy; Travel
- Subscribers: 9.91 million
- Views: 1.27 billion
- Last updated: April 6, 2026
- Website: yestheory.com

Yes Theory is a digital media brand built around a YouTube channel founded by Thomas Brag, Ammar Kandil, Matt Dahlia (formerly Matt Dajer), and Derin Emre. Originally founded as Generation Y Not, Yes Theory first gained national media attention in November 2015 with their message of inclusivity in the wake of terror attacks in Beirut and Paris. They have been featured in a range of national and international media.

Their content has been praised as experiencing foreign cultures in "a fresh and authentic way" and "consistently radiating positivity and promote living life with an open mind, exactly what YouTube and the world needs." The Yes Theory brand revolves around the group's mantra of "Seek Discomfort", a phrase also featured in the group's clothing brand, and through their second channel with 892,000 subscribers.

== Background ==
Thomas Brag was born on July 9, 1993, in Paris, France, to Swedish parents. He received his BA degree from McGill University, where he majored in entrepreneurship. He also spent a semester at Draper University and later interviewed its founder, the billionaire venture capital investor Tim Draper.

Matt Dahlia (born Matt Dajer) was born on March 28, 1992, in New York City, and grew up in Paris, France, Greenwich, Connecticut, and Perm, Russia. He also has connections to Puerto Rico on his father's side. Dahlia obtained his Bachelor of Arts degree in history from McGill University in 2014. Dahlia announced in a YouTube video on February 25, 2021, that he no longer plans to appear in the group's episodes but continues to work on the brand.

Ammar Kandil was born on April 28, 1994, in Sadat City, Egypt, and spent his early life there. He enrolled in the African Leadership Academy in South Africa. In 2011, during the Egyptian revolution, he studied at Quest University on a scholarship. In 2021, he gained Saint Kitts and Nevis citizenship, making him a dual citizen. A Saint Kitts and Nevis passport allows him to travel visa-free to over 150 countries and avoid Egypt’s compulsory military draft for men aged 18 to 30.

Derin Emre was born in Istanbul, Turkey and co-founded Yes Theory, initially taking the role of cameraman. He left Yes Theory in 2017 because of a passport issue but occasionally visits the team and has been featured in videos since.

== History ==
The group first began in Montreal, Quebec when Brag and Dahlia became friends after meeting as part of a business consulting group for McGill students. In summer 2015, Yes Theory began as a series of challenges organized by Dahlia and Brag with help from Kandil and Emre. The project was named "Project 30” in reference to the group doing thirty things in thirty days they had never done before. They came into contact with Ammar at a party after he told Thomas his plans of climbing the Pyramids of Giza. Derin was the last to join the group that summer. Each challenge was designed to push the group outside of their comfort zone.

Near the end of 2015, the group received an offer to relocate to Venice, California, and be paid to make videos by Snapchat subsidiary Vertical Networks. As part of one of their first stunts, they successfully approached the Prime Minister of Canada, Justin Trudeau, for a Christmas card, which they sold for charity with proceeds going to Syrian refugees. Trudeau commented at the time "great stuff around diversity". After their success and viral hit, Yes Theory was awarded a budget to make their first 30 videos.

== YouTube and film ==
After moving to Venice, California, they went on a series of international trips. They gained media attention in London by welcoming British people at Heathrow Airport with hugs, described in the press as "truly heartwarming". Other activities they have embarked on include taking an Irish girl on a last minute trip to Japan, who said of the experience "they try to connect to people around the world and let them know that they're not alone and bring people together".

In September 2018, their challenge to get American actor and media personality Will Smith to bungee jump from a helicopter over the Grand Canyon was taken up by Smith. In October 2018, they orchestrated a viral hoax of what appeared to be Justin Bieber eating a burrito sideways.

In February 2019, they released Frozen Alive, a feature-length documentary about endurance athlete Wim Hof. This followed a visit to Poland where they spent four days with Hof.

In December 2022, they released Project Iceman, a feature-length documentary about Anders Hofman attempting to complete the first Ironman Triathlon in Antarctica.

== Awards and nominations ==
Year	Award	Category	Result	Ref.
2021	11th Streamy Awards	First Person	Won	
2022	12th Streamy Awards	First Person	Nominated	
2023	13th Streamy Awards	Editing	Won	
