= Karma (American TV series) =

American television series

- Genre: Reality TV
- Created by: J. D. Roth; Scooter Braun
- Presented by: Michelle Khare
- Country of origin: United States
- Original language: English
- No. of seasons: 1
- No. of episodes: 8

Production
- Executive producers: J. D. Roth; Adam Greener; Sara Hansemenn; Fred Pichel
- Production company: GoodStory Entertainment

Original release
- Network: HBO Max
- Release: June 18, 2020

Karma is an American competitive children's television series hosted by Michelle Khare. It premiered on HBO Max on June 18, 2020. For unknown reasons, the show was taken down from HBO Max on September 1, 2020, and now is not currently available to view.

== Production ==
Produced by GoodStory Entertainment, Karma was co-created by actor and children's game show presenter J. D. Roth and music producer Scooter Braun. It was announced on October 9, 2019, that HBO Max had picked up the show with Michelle Khare as host with an anticipated June 2020 release date.

== The contests ==
=== The laws of Karma ===
Each team selects a law of Karma and a color to represent it. These laws are given in the form of a medallion representing each law. The eight laws of Karma in Season One were:

- Inspiration
- Connection
- Patience
- Giving
- Humility
- Growth
- Focus
- Responsibility

Once eliminated, players had their medallions given to one of the remaining teams.

=== Karma Coins ===
After the team that won the challenge selects two teams to send to the Cave of Karma, the remaining teams each receive a Karma Coin. They will give these Karma coins to one of the two teams chosen to go to the Cave at the offering. At the offering, each of the safe teams, excluding the team that won the challenge, come up one at a time and hand their team's coin to the team that they wanted to help at the Cave. The coins play a role in the cave, and having more coins would give the teams more opportunities to survive the Cave.

=== The Cave of Karma ===
The winning team of the challenge would get to select two teams to send to the Cave of Karma, where they would face off in a challenge which would eliminate one team. The challenge at the Cave was to find one (or more) Karma Coin(s (Note: If both teams do not share the same amount of coins, the goal would be to find the number of coins that the team with the lowest amount has.)) given to them. The coins were hidden by the opposing team under one of the 10 stone chambers that were on each side. After the hiding of the coins, each team would take turns to find their coin(s) by smashing open one of the chambers. The first team to find that Cave's amount of coins would win and return to the game.

== Season summaries ==
Season	Laws	Teams	Filming Location	Winning Team		Runner-Up Team		Episodes	Originally aired	
Season	Laws	Teams	Filming Location	Boy	Girl	Boy	Girl	Episodes	First aired	Last aired
Karma	8	8	Shaver Lake, California	Jack Silver	Skyla Sousa	Aaron Thomas Raye	Andrea Munoz	8	June 18, 2020	

=== Season 1 - Karma (2020) ===
The season consisted of eight teams (in order of elimination):

Position	Team	Boy		Age	Girl		Age	Starting Law of Karma	Cave Winner	Inherited Law(s)	Law(s) Held
Position	Team	Name	Hometown	Age	Name	Hometown	Age	Starting Law of Karma	Cave Winner	Inherited Law(s)	Law(s) Held
8th	Green	Elijah Mack	San Diego, CA	14	Skylie Thompson	Cyril, OK	15	Growth	Yellow	Red	1
7th	Orange	Adren Gilmore	Keller, TX	14	Presley Alexander	Los Angeles, CA	14	Focus	Yellow	Yellow	1
6th	Yellow	Elijah “Eli” Naidas	Melbourne, FL	14	Illya Mehrzai	Houston, TX	14	Patience	Grey	Pink	2
5th	Grey	Huck Flanagan	Pomfret, CT	15	Sienna Coward	Martinez, CA	14	Humility	Blue	Blue	1
4th	Blue	Luke Youssef	Hampton Falls, NH	14	Ariana Pettit	St. Johns, AZ	14	Responsibility	Red	Purple	2
3rd	Pink	Justin Darrigo	Tewksbury, MA	14	Avon Stoutamire	Mary, SC	15	Giving	Purple		3
2nd	Red	Aaron Thomas Raye	Newburgh, ME	13	Andrea Munoz	Miami, FL	14	Connection	Purple (Finale)		4
1st	Purple	Jack Silver	Rahway, NJ	14	Skyla Sousa	Lowell, MA	14	Inspiration	Purple (Finale)		4

Right-to-Stay Eliminations

Boy			Girl		
Name	Hometown	Age	Name	Hometown	Age
Jack Silver	Rahway, NJ	14	Ciera	The Bronx, NY	14
Harrison Halewood	Crowley, TX	15	Ciera	The Bronx, NY	14

==== Elimination table ====
Contestants	Episodes								
Contestants	1	2	3	4	5	6	7	8	
Jack & Skyla	SAFE	SAFE	SAFE	SAFE	SAFE	SAFE	CAVE	WIN (2)	FIRST
Aaron & Andrea	SAFE	SAFE	SAFE	SAFE	WIN	CAVE	WIN	WIN (4)	SECOND
Avon & Justin	SAFE	SAFE	SAFE	WIN	SAFE	WIN	OUT		
Ariana & Luke	SAFE	SAFE	WIN	SAFE	CAVE	OUT			
Huck & Sienna	SAFE	WIN	SAFE	CAVE	OUT				
Eli & Illya	SAFE	CAVE	CAVE	OUT					
Adren & Presley	SAFE	SAFE	OUT						
Mack & Skylie	WIN	OUT							
Harrison	QUIT								
Ciera	OUT								

Key
The team won the Final Cave Challenge and became “Karma” Champions.
The team lost the Final Cave Challenge and were the runners-up.
The contestant won the team selection challenge and created all the teams of Karma.
The team won the Team Challenge and sent two other teams to the Cave of Karma.
The contestant won Laws of Karma at a challenge.
The team did not win the challenge, but was safe from going to the Cave of Karma.
The team won at the Cave of Karma and avoided elimination.
The team lost at the Cave of Karma and was eliminated.
The contestant was eliminated at the Right to Stay.
The contestant withdrew from the competition.

==== Offering Summary ====
	EPISODES						
TEAMS	2	3	4	5	6	7	8**
Purple	Yellow	Orange	Yellow	Gray	Blue	CAVE	FINALIST
Red	Yellow	Orange	Yellow	WIN	CAVE	WIN	FINALIST
Pink	Yellow	Orange	WIN	Blue	WIN	CAVE	Purple
Blue	Yellow	WIN	Gray*	CAVE	CAVE		Purple
Gray	WIN	Orange	CAVE	CAVE			Purple
Yellow	CAVE	CAVE	CAVE				Red
Orange	Yellow	CAVE					Red
Green	CAVE						Red

*Blue team offered Gray team one regular Karma coin, plus an extra Karma coin they won in the "Tlit" team challenge.

**In the Final, the eliminated teams offered clues instead of coins to the final two teams. These clues would help them in the final Cave of Karma.

WIN: The team won the challenge. Since they nominated two team to go to The Cave of Karma, they will not make an offering.

CAVE: The team was sent to go to The Cave of Karma.

FINALIST: The team is a Karma finalist.

==== Cave of Karma Matches ====
Episodes	Matches	
2	Yellow 1 coin found	Green No coin found
3	Yellow 1 coin found	Orange No coin found
4	Gray 4 coins found	Yellow 2 coins found
5	Blue 3 coins found	Gray 2 coins found
6	Red 2 coins found	Blue 1 coin found
7	Purple 2 coins found	Pink No coins found
