= Mikayla Nogueira =

TikTok star and makeup artist (born 1998)

- Born: Mikayla Jane Nogueira; June 13, 1998 (age 28)
- Education: Bryant University (BA)
- Occupation: Social media influencer

TikTok information
- Page: mikaylanogueira
- Genres: Fashion, makeup
- Followers: 17.4 million
- Last updated: May 23, 2026

Mikayla Jane Nogueira (born June 13, 1998) is an American social media influencer and businesswoman. She has over 17 million followers on TikTok, where she posts beauty and makeup content. She is the co-founder of the cosmetics brand POV Beauty.

== Personal life ==
Nogueira was born to Patrice and Michael Nogueira in 1998. She has an older brother and an older sister. Her family is mostly of Portuguese descent. She was raised in East Freetown, Massachusetts, and graduated from Apponequet Regional High School in 2016. She has stated that her love for makeup started when she bought Avon Products from a friend of her mother.

Nogueira attended Bryant University, where she graduated with a Bachelor of Arts in communications in 2020. In college, she was an intern for a radio station. Nogueira started graduate school in 2020, but "ended up dropping out of school when I found out I'd have to do it full-time instead of part-time because of the pandemic."

Nogueira married Cody Hawken, whose family owns a fishing supply store, on July 1, 2023, at Castle Hill Inn in Newport, Rhode Island. Nogueira announced that she and Hawken planned to divorce in February of 2026, and the divorce was finalized on July 28 of the same year.

== Career ==
=== TikTok ===
Nogueira was employed by Ulta Beauty as a beauty advisor until late 2020. She originally created her TikTok page in March of 2020 to help her mother, a teacher, continue educating her students during the COVID-19 pandemic. Nogueira eventually participated in "The Catfish Challenge", a viral TikTok trend in which a person compares their appearance before and after makeup. That video accrued thousands of views within hours of posting. Nogueira now posts tutorials, reviews, beauty routines, promotions, and other beauty and makeup videos. In December 2020, Nogueira won the American Influencer Award for Emerging Makeup Artist of the Year. Nogueira had 4.5 million followers by March of 2021, and her following has grown to 17.4 million as of February 2026.

Nogueira was accused of faking her rural Massachusetts accent based on videos from her college career and early TikTok videos in which she had "a neutral East Coast accent". Nogueira responded that the accent heard in the earlier clips was her "customer service voice". Nogueira was later accused of using beauty filters and video editing to alter her appearance on TikTok after she was filmed attending the red carpet premiere of Disney+'s Hannah Montana 20th Anniversary Special on March 23rd, 2026. She denied using beauty filters, stating "I cannot do anything about the fact that you saw a hideous video of me on the internet and you have come to the conclusion that I am lying about the way I look."

Viewers have criticized Nogueria's cosmetic reviews for being misleading, including those for her own brand. In January 2023, Nogueira was accused of wearing false eyelashes during a sponsored review for L’Oreal Telescopic Life mascara, which she denied.

=== Point of View (POV) Beauty ===
Nogueira launched Point of View Beauty (stylized as "POV Beauty") alongside co-founder Ani Hadjinian and venture capital firm Imaginary Ventures in March of 2025. The brand initially offered five products aimed at preparing skin for makeup application, including four for the face and one for the lips. Nogueira and POV Beauty used social media marketing tactics to advertise the products, including hiring a content team, giving product boxes to creators and community members, and designing applicators to be visually appealing on camera. Sales reportedly reached $1 million in the first 7 minutes following launch, with over 100,000 people joining the waitlist for the restock. POV Beauty has since released a series of lip products as well.
