= Foodbeast =

Food and drink magazine

- Website type: Food news
- Available in: English
- Headquarters: Santa Ana, California, United States
- Creator: Elie Ayrouth
- Website: foodbeast.com
- Commercial: Yes
- Launched: 2008

Foodbeast (stylized in all caps) is a food and drink publication and influencer network company headquartered in Santa Ana, California.

== History ==
Foodbeast was founded by Elie Ayrouth in 2008.

== Food festivals ==
On September 1, 2019, Foodbeast held the "Nood Beach food festival". The festival, hosted in Huntington Beach, featured noodle vendors and musicians Snoop Dogg, E-40, and Dash Berlin.

== Social media vending machines ==
On February 28, 2019, Foodbeast began a social media vending machine campaign in collaboration with Nissin Foods USA. Two Foodbeast branded vending machines were installed, one in a mall in Las Vegas, and another in Los Angeles.

== Media ==
Foodbeast staff was featured on the MTV2 show "Jobs That Don't Suck" hosted by Andrew Schulz. Their episode showed founders Elie Ayrouth, Rudy Chaney as they opened food packages and visited the Taco Bell test kitchen.

== Controversy ==
=== In-N-Out 'Monkey Style' Burger ===
On June 28, 2013, a video was uploaded to Foodbeast's YouTube channel entitled "Ordering a Monkey Style Burger from In-N-Out." The video depicted the Foodbeast founder in an In-N-Out drive-thru ordering what he claims is a Monkey Style burger, a hamburger topped with the chain's Animal Style fries (cheese, grilled onions and spread). This resulted in many patrons trying to order their burger Monkey Style.

"There is no such thing," Carl Van Fleet, a vice president at In-N-Out Burger, said in a statement. "For a variety of reasons, we're unable to prepare burgers in the manner that a few websites have described as 'monkey style.' "

CBS covered the story in a late-night piece, with their KCAL9 team asking Ayrouth "if he tried to create a hoax by simply putting an order of fries on top of a burger." KCAL9 states that he did not respond.
