= Max Alexander (fashion designer) =

American fashion designer (born 2016)

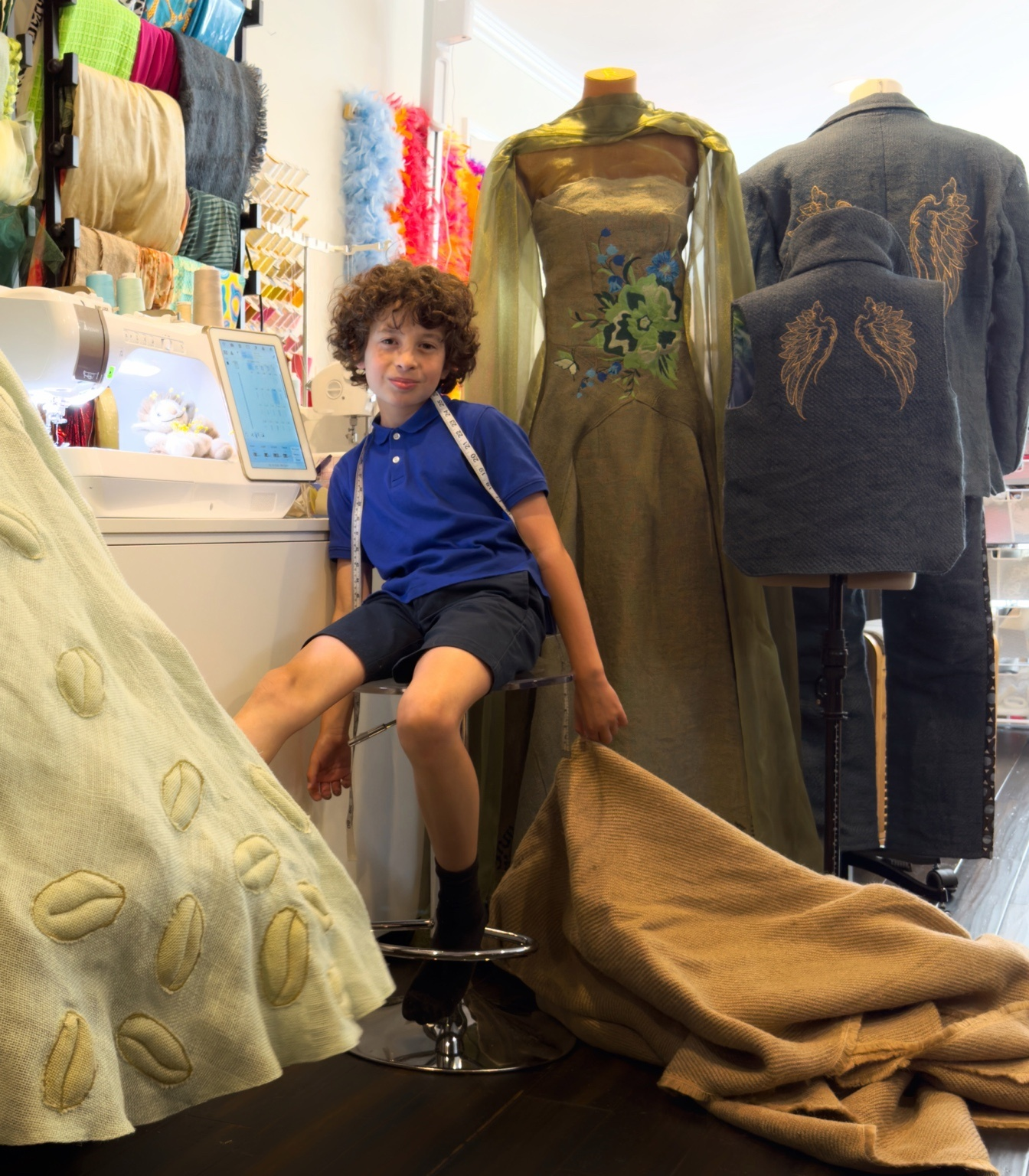
- Alexander in his Los Angeles studio, 2026
- Born: Max Alexander Madison; February 25, 2016 (age 10); Los Angeles, California
- Occupation: Fashion designer
- Years active: 2020–present
- Website: maxalexander.shop

Max Alexander Madison (born February 25, 2016), also known as Couture to the Max, is an American fashion designer. He makes women's wear and is known for his vibrant and layered designs. In 2024, he became the youngest designer to present at a runway show at seven years old and in 2026, he became the youngest designer to debut at Paris Fashion Week.

== Early life ==
Max Alexander Madison was born on February 25, 2016, in Los Angeles, California. His mother, Sherri Madison, is an artist who mainly uses reused cardboard in her works; she also made an appearance on the reality television series Craftopia. His father, Jack Kolodny, is Canadian. His grandfather owned a dress business in Montreal, while his great-grandfather worked as a cutter in Russia and went on to own over forty dress stores. Alexander has a little brother, Dorian, who assists him with his work. He also has an older sister.

== Career ==
Alexander had wanted to be a dressmaker since he was four. His mother, a cardboard artist, made him his first mannequin. Alexander later saved up for his first sewing machine, selling his pieces to buy fabric. He was primarily self-taught, not taking sewing lessons until 2022. He also went viral on Instagram; his account was created in 2020 and was originally meant as a way to show his grandparents his hobby. He was gifted various sewing gadgets and tools from fans. By 2023, he had begun receiving commissions from celebrities, such as Sharon Stone and Debra Messing.

In 2024, Alexander was also invited to the New York Fashion Week, where he created a swimsuit line and became the youngest fashion designer to present at a runway show. On March 3, 2026, just after his tenth birthday, he debuted at Paris Fashion Week at the Palais Garnier, becoming the youngest designer to do so. His fifteen pieces at the event were inspired by flowers, imagination, and recycling. 90% of his collection was biodegradable, recyclable, sustainable, or made from dead stock and surplus. In June, a documentary about Alexander premiered at the Tribeca Festival.

== Awards and nominations ==
Year	Award	Category	Result	Ref.
2023	Streamy Awards	Fashion	Nominated	
2025	International Design Awards	Haute Couture	Won	
