= 12th Streamy Awards =

2022 awards ceremony recognizing online video

- Date: December 4, 2022
- Location: The Beverly Hilton, Beverly Hills, California, United States
- Presented by: Streamys Blue Ribbon Panel
- Hosted by: Airrack

Highlights
- Most awards: Mark Rober (4)
- Most nominations: MrBeast (7)
- Year Awards: Good Mythical Morning (Show of the Year); MrBeast (Creator of the Year); Kai Cenat (Streamer of the Year); Whalar (Agency of the Year); Old Spice (Brand of the Year)

Television/radio coverage
- Network: YouTube
- Produced by: Dick Clark Productions; Tubefilter

The 12th Annual Streamy Awards was the twelfth installment of the Streamy Awards honoring the best in American streaming television series and their creators. The ceremony was held in The Beverly Hilton in Beverly Hills, California on December 4, 2022. It was hosted by Airrack and livestreamed exclusively to his YouTube channel, making it the first Streamy Awards to be livestreamed to a content creator's channel. It was also the first Streamy Awards to be held in-person since the 9th Streamy Awards in 2019. A number of new gaming-related awards were introduced for the 12th Streamy Awards and an award for VTubers, streamers who use a virtual avatar to present themselves. The Streamys Brand Award were featured for the fifth year in a row and the Creator Honor awards for the third.

== Performers ==
The 12th Streamy Awards featured a musical performance from Yung Gravy accompanied by viral videos about his songs.

Performers at the 12th Streamy Awards
Artist(s)	Song(s)
Yung Gravy	"Betty (Get Money)"

== Winners and nominees ==
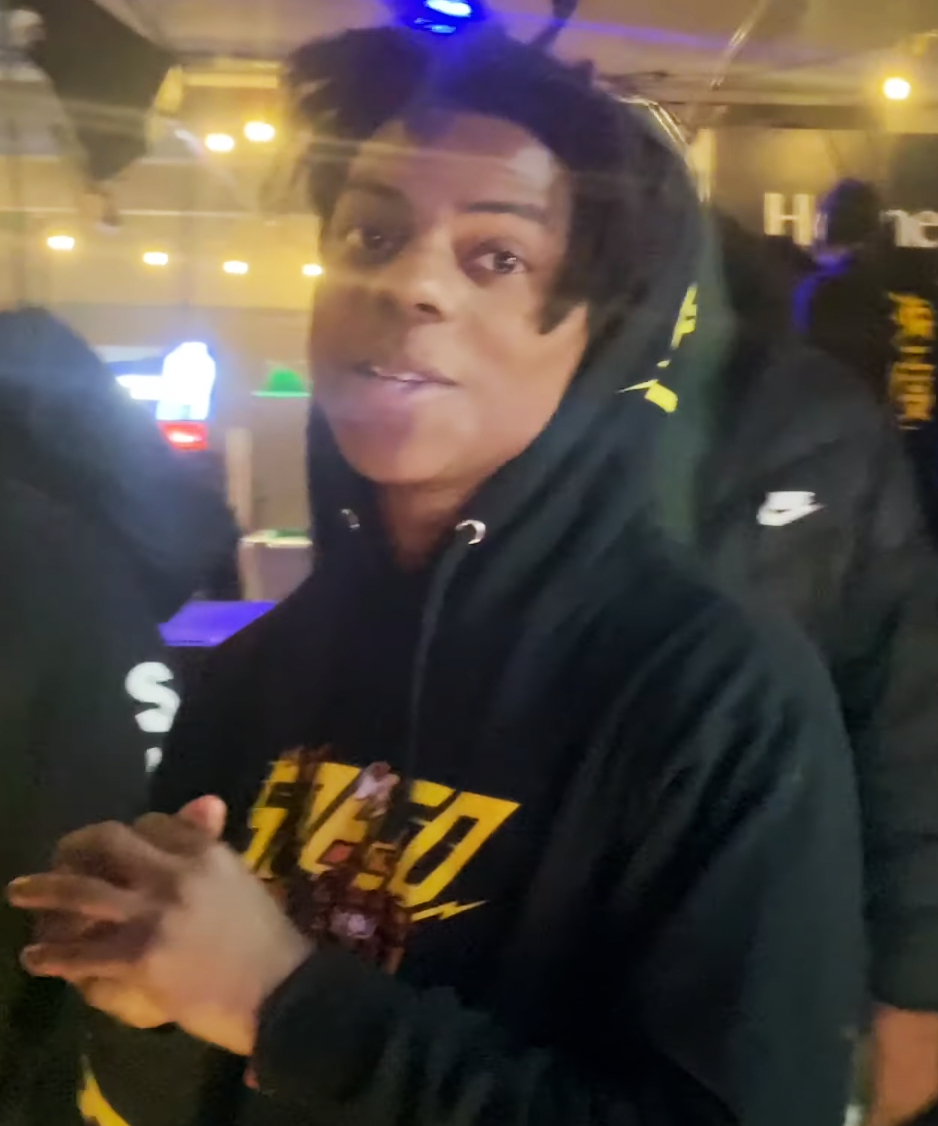
IShowSpeed, winner of the Breakout Streamer Award

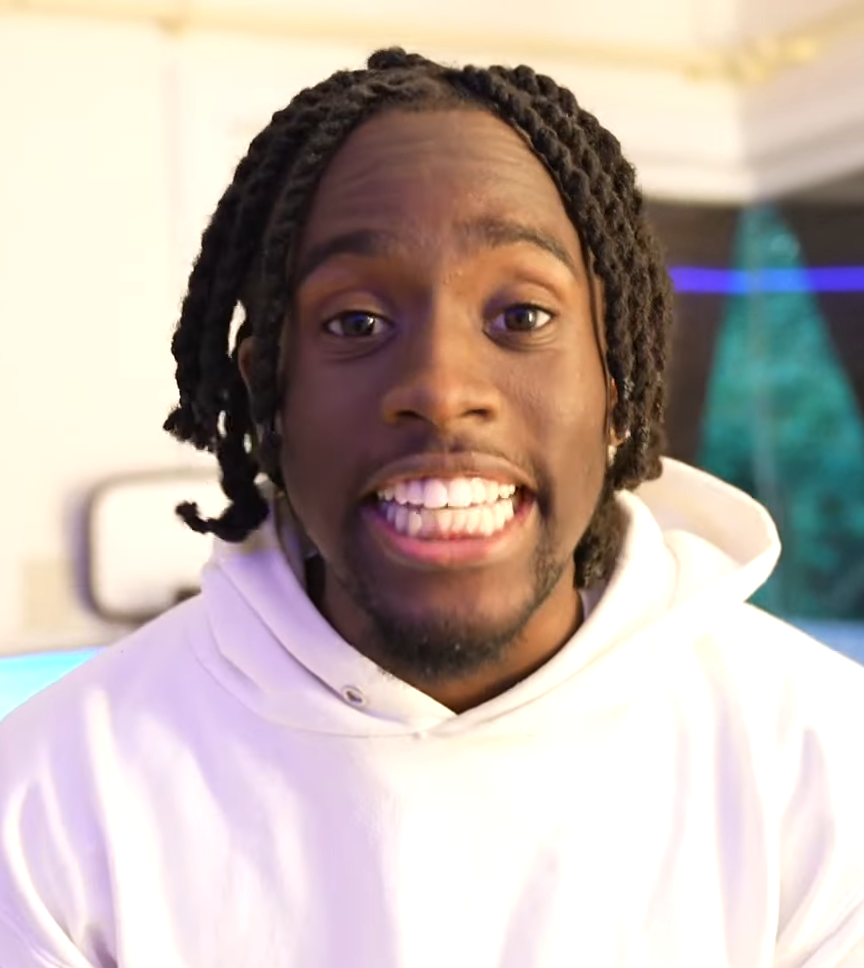
Kai Cenat, winner of the Streamer of the Year Award

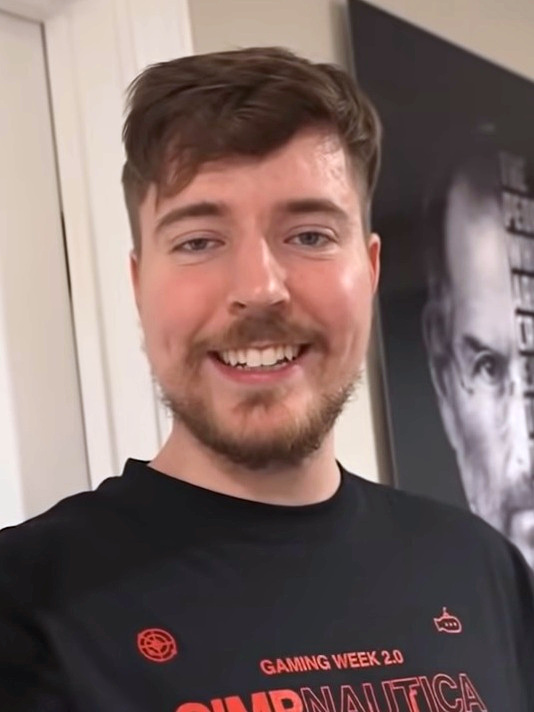
MrBeast, winner of Creator of the Year, Creator For Social Good, and Brand Engagement Awards

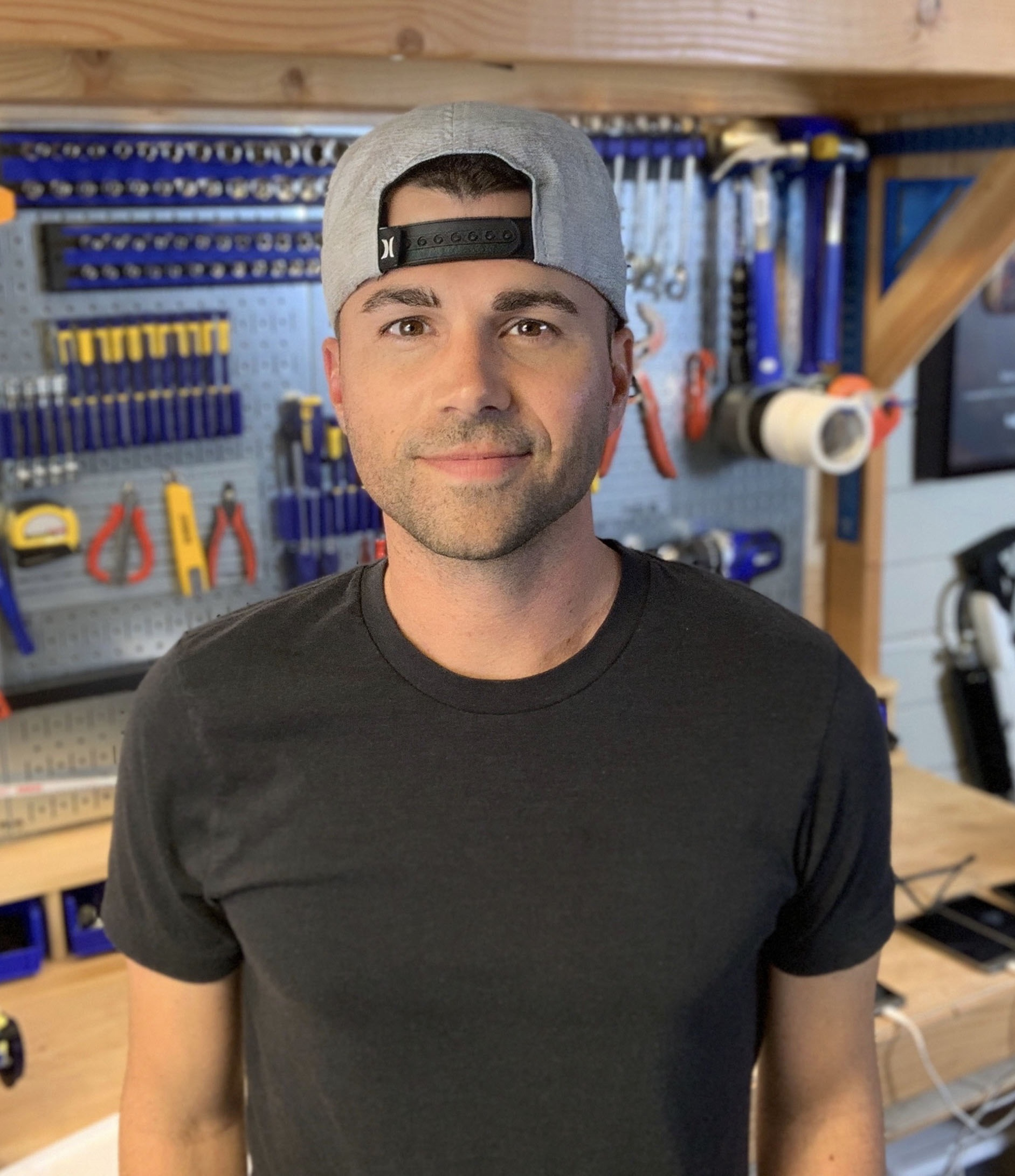
Mark Rober, winner of Science and Engineering, Creator For Social Good, Collaboration, and Brand Engagement Awards

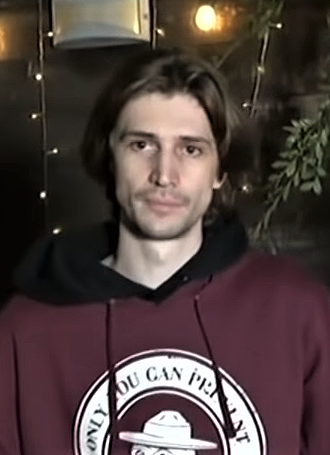
xQc, winner of the Just Chatting Award

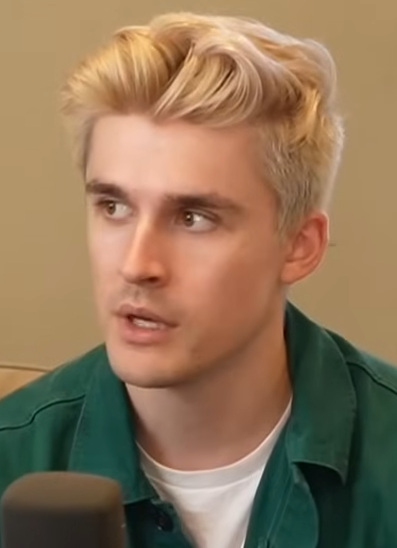
Ludwig, winner of the Variety Streamer Award

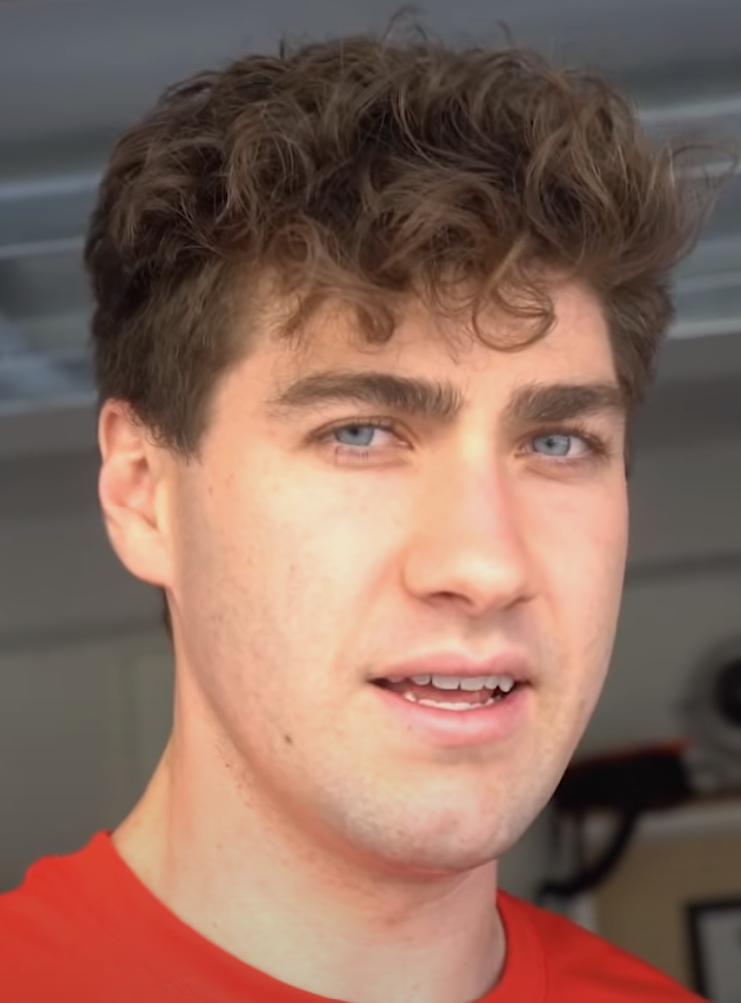
Airrack, winner of the First Person Award

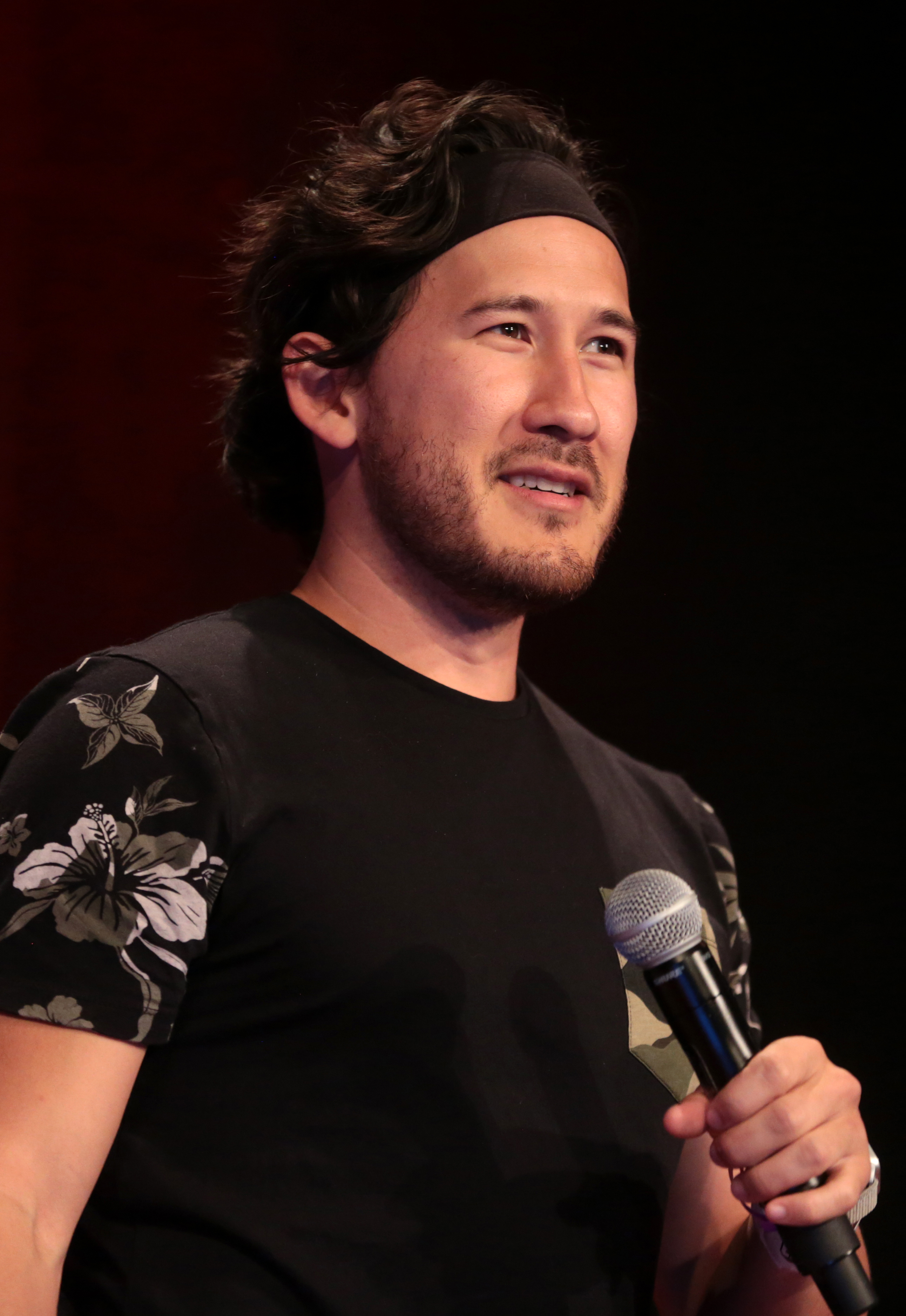
Markiplier, winner of the Gamer and Scripted Series Award

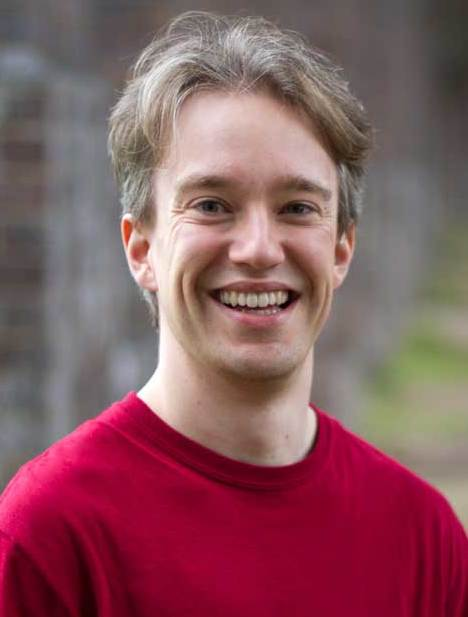
Tom Scott, winner of the Learning and Education Award

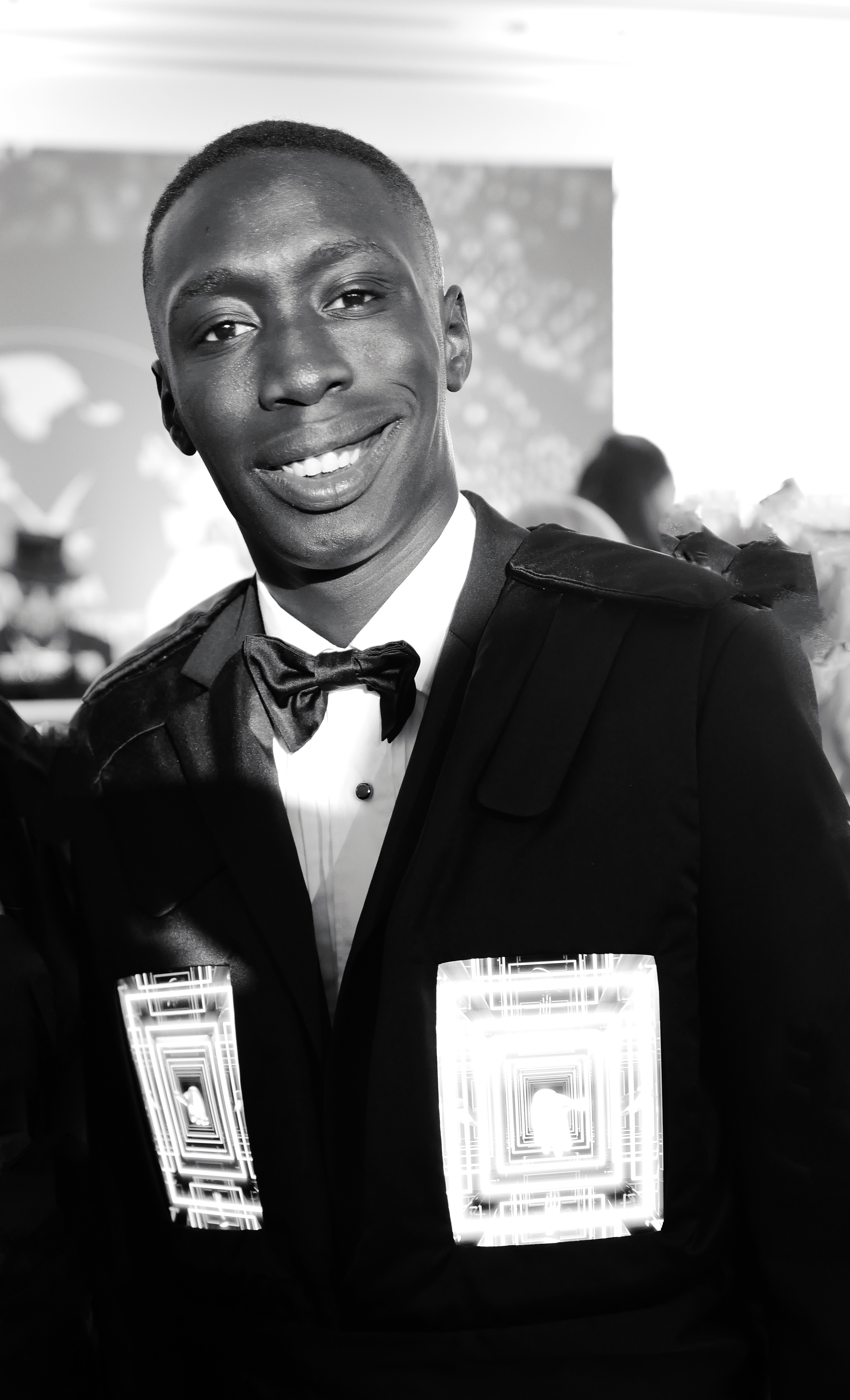
Khaby Lame, winner of the International Award

The nominees were announced on October 27, 2022. Winners were announced during the main ceremony on December 4, hosted by Airrack from The Beverly Hilton hotel. Bob the Drag Queen was the live announcer for the event. The Creator For Social Good award was presented by The Elevate Prize Foundation and came with an award of $50,000 to commit to a worthy cause of the winner's choosing.

Winners are listed first, in bold.

OVERALL
Show of the Year	Creator of the Year
**Good Mythical Morning** **(by Rhett & Link)**; Challenge Accepted (by Michelle Khare); Chicken Shop Date (by Amelia Dimoldenberg); Hot Ones (by First We Feast); I spent a day with (by Anthony Padilla); In Space with Markiplier (by Markiplier); RDCWorld; Sidetalk; Twitch Rivals; UNHhhh (by WOWPresents)	**MrBeast**; Addison Rae; Airrack; Blogilates; Charli D'Amelio; Dream; JiDion; Logan Paul; Mark Rober; MrBallen
Streamer of the Year	International
**Kai Cenat**; HasanAbi; IShowSpeed; Kyedae; Ludwig; Pokimane; Quackity; tarik; Valkyrae; xQc	**Khaby Lame Italy**; The Anazala Family United Arab Emirates; Enaldinho Brazil; HikakinTV Japan; Mythpat India
Short Form	
**Sheena Melwani**; DeMarcus Shawn; Ian Boggs; Savanah Moss; Cheeky Boyos	
INDIVIDUAL AWARDS
Breakout Creator	Breakout Streamer
**Ryan Trahan**; Benoftheweek; Kallmekris; Kirsten Titus; MrBallen	**IShowSpeed**; Emiru; Kai Cenat; kkatamina; QTCinderella
Collaboration	Creator For Social Good
**Mark Rober, Jim Browning, and Trilogy Media – Pranks Destroy Scam Callers – GlitterBomb Payback**; JustDustin, Hacksmith Industries, and Unspeakable – First YouTuber To Break The Orb Wins $10,000; Ludwig – My Gameshow Broke YouTube; MrBeast – Extreme $1,000,000 Hide And Seek; Sam and Colby, Kallmekris, and Celina SpookyBoo – Our Unexplainable Night at Crescent Hotel	**MrBeast and Mark Rober – #TeamSeas**; Invisible People; MrBallen – MrBallen Foundation; Ryan Trahan – Feeding America; The Game Theorists – St. Jude Children's Research Hospital
Creator Product	Crossover
**POPFLEX – Blogilates**; Feastables – MrBeast; Happy Dad – NELK; Holo Taco – Simply Nailogical; PRIME Hydration – Logan Paul and KSI	**Gordon Ramsay**; Dwayne "The Rock" Johnson; Hailey Rhode Bieber; Lili Reinhart, Camila Mendes, Madelaine Petsch (blondebrunetteredhead); Post Malone
First Person	Just Chatting
**Airrack**; courtreezy; JiDion; Safiya Nygaard; Yes Theory	**xQc**; BruceDropEmOff; HasanAbi; Kai Cenat; Quackity
Variety Streamer	VTuber
**Ludwig**; Asmongold; Lirik; MoistCr1TiKaL; Valkyrae	**CodeMiko**; Ironmouse; Nyanners; Veibae; Zentreya
SHOW AWARDS
Scripted Series	Unscripted Series
**In Space with Markiplier (by Markiplier)**; Dhar Mann; Jack Pop; NORMAL BRITISH SERIES (by Brandon Rogers); RDCWorld	**Challenge Accepted (by Michelle Khare)**; Chicken Shop Date (by Amelia Dimoldenberg); I spent a day with (by Anthony Padilla); Sidetalk; UNHhhh (by WOWPresents)
Podcast	
**Call Her Daddy**; H3 Podcast; IMPAULSIVE; MrBallen Podcast; On Purpose with Jay Shetty	
SUBJECT AWARDS
Animated	Beauty
**MeatCanyon**; Haminations; illymation; Jaiden Animations; Ketnipz	**MissDarcei**; Bailey Sarian; Brad Mondo; Mikayla Nogueira; NikkieTutorials
Comedy	Commentary
**RDCWorld**; Adrian Bliss; KallMeKris; Rich Black Guy; The McFarlands	**Danny Gonzalez**; Chad Chad; Drew Gooden; Jarvis Johnson; LegalEagle
Competitive Gamer	Dance
**tarik**; iiTzTimmy; NICKMERCS; Shroud; TenZ	**Énola Bédard**; BDASH; Matt Steffanina; Merrick Hanna; Michael Le
Fashion and Style	Food
**Wisdom Kaye**; Gunnar Deatherage; Kenz Lawrén; Mina Le; Nikita Dragun	**Cooking With Lynja**; Babish Culinary Universe; Nick DiGiovanni; Sideserf Cake Studio; Uncle Roger
Gamer	Health and Wellness
**Markiplier**; Aphmau; Dream; LazarBeam; TommyInnit	**Doctor Mike**; Austen Alexander; Blogilates; Dr Julie; The Fitness Marshall
Kids and Family	Learning and Education
**Rebecca Zamolo**; Brody Hudson Schaffer; FunnyMike; Ninja Kidz TV; Zeth & Saylor	**Tom Scott**; bigweirdworld; Casual Geographic; Colin and Samir; Veritasium
Lifestyle	News
**Charli D'Amelio**; Alexa Rivera; Brent Rivera; Kara and Nate; Retirement House	**HasanAbi**; Brian Tyler Cohen; Channel 5 with Andrew Callaghan; Gay News by Josh Helfgott; The Philip DeFranco Show
Science and Engineering	Sports
**Mark Rober**; I did a thing; JLaservideo; Simone Giertz; Westen Champlin	**Jesser**; Blind Surfer Pete Gustin; FaZe Deestroying; Ryan Garcia; Tara and Hunter
Technology	
**Mrwhosetheboss**; Glarses; iJustine; Linus Tech Tips; Marques Brownlee	
CRAFT AWARDS
Cinematography	Editing
**Lyrical Lemonade**; Ashley Xu; Go4x4; James Hoffmann; Samba Films	**Cooking With Lynja**; Airrack; Brandon Rogers; MrBeast; UNHhhh (by WOWPresents)
Visual and Special Effects	Writing
**SoKrispyMedia**; Buttered Side Down; Corridor Crew; Happy Kelli; Zach King	**Brandon Rogers**; Baron Ryan; Daniel Thrasher; Julie Nolke; LongBeachGriffy

=== Brand Awards ===
BRAND AWARDS
Agency of the Year	Brand of the Year
**Whalar**; BEN; Portal A; Reach Agency; Spacestation Integrations	**Old Spice**; Harry Potter; Insta360; SpongeBob; Tampax
Branded Series	Branded Video
**Old Spice Writer's Room – LOL Network**; Harry Potter Magical Movie Moments – Wizarding World; Lenovo #GamerVsWorld – SypherPK; Pineapple Playhouse – SpongeBob SquarePants; Red Notice Twist On the Movie Trailer – Netflix and TikTok	**Gorgeous, gorgeous people love Clé de Peau Beauté concealer! – Martha Stewart**; 15,000 Dominoes – Harry Potter HOGWARTS HOUSES! – Hevesh5; I don't even know anymore lmao Andra Gogan (Insta360) – Merrick Hanna; Portal Chase MARATHON ft. SpongeBob, Loud House, Casagrandes & Henry Danger! – Nickelodeon Cartoon Universe; When u try to stay hydrated without Old Spice body wash – Adam W
Influencer Campaign	Social Impact Campaign
**The Ultimate Teammate – Tampax**; Belonging – Google and YouTube BrandConnect; Men Have Skin Too – Old Spice; Standard – Nebula; Unmask Your Smile – Philips Sonicare	**Once Upon A Bi – Tinder**; The (RED) Creator Cup 2022 – (RED); #TeamSeas – MrBeast and Mark Rober; Don't Look Away – Everytown for Gun Safety; PSA: Protect Our Families – GLAAD
Brand Engagement	
**#TeamSeas – MrBeast and Mark Rober**; Apex Legends – Celebrate the Gaiden Event with Apex Legends VTuber Avatars; Five Nights at Freddy's – Freddy & Friends: On Tour; HelloFresh – StreamElements Teams Up With HelloFresh; Red Notice – Netflix x TikTok Twist On the Movie Trailer	

== Reception ==
Upon release of the list of nominees, Alex Tsiaoussidis of Dot Esports argued that a number of streamers were snubbed from the awards, including Amouranth, Dr Disrespect, Gaules, Ibai, Tarik, and TimTheTatman.
