= Airrack =

American YouTuber (born 1997)

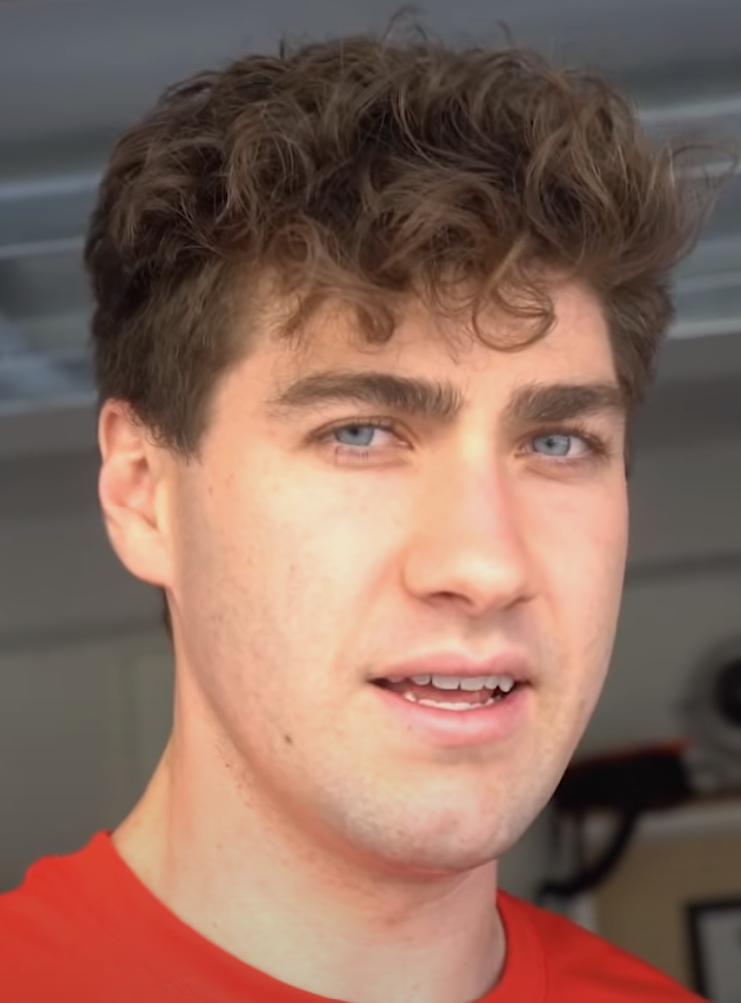
- Decker in 2021
- Born: Eric Decker; January 12, 1997 (age 29); Atlanta, Georgia, U.S.
- Occupation: YouTuber

YouTube information
- Channel: Airrack
- Years active: 2019-Present
- Genres: Vlog; pranks; challenges
- Subscribers: 19.7 million
- Views: 5 billion
- Last updated: November 22, 2026

Eric Decker (born January 12, 1997), better known online as Airrack, is an American YouTuber and vlogger. He is widely known for his challenge and prank content, and for gaining a million subscribers on YouTube in a year. Decker is also the co-founder of Creator Now, an educational program for online content creation.

== Early life ==
According to Decker, he first discovered YouTube when he was in fifth grade and was inspired to film a music video for the Flo Rida song "Low". He later went to college but dropped out to start a wedding video production company. He worked there for four years before becoming a full-time YouTuber.

== Online career ==
=== 2019–2020 ===
Decker launched his YouTube channel in July 2019. He became known for videos gate crashing events, including Tomorrowland music festival, the VIP section of a Travis Scott concert, and an attempt to crash Justin Bieber's wedding in September 2019. Creating vlogs, pranks and challenge videos, he gained 880,000 subscribers by December 2020. Aiming to reach a million subscribers by the end of the year, he partnered with creator startup Stir for a campaign for subscribers in which he stranded himself on a deserted island. Stir set up a website called "Save Airrack" which provided a referral system for fans to refer new subscribers to his channel for rewards such as thank you letters, the opportunity to feature in collaboration videos, and the ability to choose a design for Decker to have as a tattoo. He successfully reached a million subscribers on December 27 after having gained 250,000 subscribers within two weeks.

=== 2021–present ===
Decker continued to create prank and social experiment videos into 2021, including a May video in which he hired over 50 bodyguards to convince people that he was a celebrity. In November 2021, Decker hosted a MrBeast-inspired ping pong tournament called XTreme Pong, which featured influencer competitors, a prize and crypto elements including NFTs. That December, he participated in the third installment of MrBeast's YouTube Originals show Creator Games for a prize of $1 million. Zach King won the competition but later donated $55 thousand of the prize money to a charity of Decker's choice, the Atlanta Community Food Bank, after Decker agreed to eat hot wings with a heat of 3 million Scoville units.

In January 2022, KTLA 5 reported on an unknown man scaling a building in downtown Los Angeles dressed as Spider-Man. Decker claimed that he had climbed the building in an attempt to gain the attention of Marvel so they would cast him as the character in their next Spider-Man film. He told Insider that the stunt was "dead serious" and that he was "here to get a part — any part — in a Marvel movie and I will not stop until the mission is accomplished". In September 2022, Decker was a keynote speaker at the annual VidSummit conference where he spoke about the creator economy. That same November, he was invited to join FaZe Clan by MrBeast. He hosted the 12th Streamy Awards on December 4, 2022, which was livestreamed exclusively to his YouTube channel. Decker reached 10 million subscribers in 2022, hitting the milestone in under three years.

In January 2023, the restaurant chain Pizza Hut collaborated with Decker to create the world's largest pizza, breaking the Guinness World Record with a 13,990-square-foot pizza. The pizza was used in Pizza Hut's Super Bowl commercial for the return of its "Big New Yorker". He also broke the Guinness World Record for most fast food restaurants visited in 24 hours by visiting 100 pizzerias in New York City later in the year. Decker's gate crashing videos continued into 2023 with a May video in which he bypassed security at the Crypto.com Arena by impersonating Austin Reaves. Due to the prank's virality and severity, Decker received a lifetime ban from the NBA, which was put into place by NBA commissioner, Adam Silver. In September 2023, Decker signed with United Talent Agency.

== Other ventures ==
Creator Now
- Industry: Creator economy
- Founded: May 2021
- Founder: Eric Decker, Zack Honarvar, Kate Ward
- Website: creatornow.com

In May 2021, Decker co-founded Creator Now, an educational program for online content creation, with One Day Entertainment managers Zack Honarvar and Kate Ward. It raised million of funding from investors including Upfront Ventures, Casey Neistat, Justin Kan, and Jack Conte. The company was acquired by creator analytics platform VidIQ in January 2024.

=== Video cameos and stream infiltrations ===
In addition to his challenge and prank content, Decker is known for a recurring concept on his channel in which he secretly sneaks into or photobombs the videos and live streams of other prominent content creators and public figures. The series has featured him attempting to hide in plain sight or blend into the background during live broadcasts and recorded videos, including streams hosted by Kai Cenat and the FaZe Clan house, as well as videos produced by MrBeast and Ryan Trahan.

== Personal life ==
Decker has been engaged to Hope LaVine since 2025.

== Awards and nominations ==
Year	Ceremony	Category	Result	Ref.
2021	11th Streamy Awards	First Person	Nominated	
2022	12th Streamy Awards	Creator of the Year	Nominated	
2022	12th Streamy Awards	First Person	Won	
2022	12th Streamy Awards	Editing	Nominated	
