= Helfgott =

Helfgott is a surname. Notable people with the surname include:

- Ben Helfgott (1929–2023), British Holocaust survivor, and champion weightlifter
- David Helfgott (born 1947), Australian concert pianist
- Harald Helfgott (born 1977), Peruvian mathematician
- Josh Helfgott (born 1989), American LGBTQ+ activist and content creator

== See also ==
- Nathaniel Helfgot (born 1963), American rabbi
- Yitzchak Meir Helfgot (born 1969), Jewish Cantor
