= KallMeKris =

Canadian social media personality and actress (born 1996)

Kallmekris
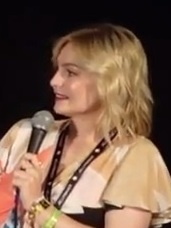
- Collins in 2022
- Born: Kristina Lee Halliwell Collins; July 1, 1996 (age 30); Abbotsford, British Columbia, Canada
- Education: University of the Fraser Valley (dropped out)
- Occupations: Social media personality; actress; comedian; filmmaker
- Years active: 2020–present
- Organization: SourBoys
- Spouse: Caleb Phelps (m. 2025)

TikTok information
- Page: Kris HC
- Genres: Comedy; satire
- Followers: 50.3 million

YouTube information
- Channel: Kallmekris
- Genres: Comedy; satire; vlog; reaction; true crime; paranormal
- Subscribers: 13.2 million
- Views: 3.8 billion
- Last updated: November 3, 2026

Kristina Lee Halliwell "Kris" Collins (born July 1, 1996), known online as Kallmekris, is a Canadian social media personality and actress. Known for her skits that range from thirty seconds to a minute long, Collins began posting on TikTok in April 2020. As of November 2026, she has 50.3 million followers, making her the most-followed TikToker from Canada and the 42nd overall. Her YouTube channel, which she began uploading to in 2020, has 13.2 million subscribers as of November 2026. In July 2025, she made her feature directorial debut with the found footage horror film, House on Eden.

Collins attended the University of the Fraser Valley but dropped out before graduating. She then resumed her previous career as a hair stylist until April 2020 and the COVID-19 pandemic. Collins registered her TikTok account on April 9, 2020, and posted her first video that day: a lip-sync to the audio of a line spoken by John C. Reilly in the 2008 film Step Brothers.

== Early life and education ==
Kristina Lee Halliwell Collins was born on July 1, 1996 in Abbotsford, British Columbia, Canada. She was raised in a conservative family and is the second-oldest of three sisters and two brothers. Collins wanted to pursue a career in stand-up comedy from an early age. Because she came from a larger family and felt like she was not receiving enough attention, she found out how to express herself through comedy. "I kind of wanted to shine in any way I could in the family and try to get maybe a little bit of attention...[through] cracking jokes, maybe being a little bit of an asshole sometimes so my parents would notice me."

At the age of 14, Collins started a house cleaning business which she kept up until she was 23. After dropping out of the University of the Fraser Valley to become a teacher, she started working as a hairdresser and working on TV shows out of her parents' home.

== Career ==
=== 2020–2021: Early start and rise to prominence on TikTok ===
Collins left her career as a hairdresser in April 2020 due to the COVID-19 pandemic. She joined TikTok that same month. Her brother convinced her to register a TikTok account and has stated that she did so out of boredom.

Collins registered her TikTok account on April 9, 2020, and posted her first video on the same day, which was a lip-sync to an audio of a line spoken by John C. Reilly in the 2008 film Step Brothers. Her earliest TikToks were mainly lip-syncing and clips inspired by her family and childhood. Later TikToks consist of comedic skits where she plays multiple recurring characters. According to The Netline, "Her most popular personas include a vampire-obsessed version of her 12-year-old self, a Boston bro-dude named Chad, a fed-up mom, and a tiny-handed toddler." She also does vlogs and reaction videos on her YouTube channel. She had partnered with Amazon, Lionsgate, and Pantene in the past. A company representative at Red Bull reached out to Collins after her fans continuously urged the company to sponsor Kris. She was given a lifetime supply of Red Bull. The company also flew her out to the top of a mountain in British Columbia in celebration of hitting 10 million followers. In 2021, Forbes listed her as the fifth highest-earning TikToker at $4.75 million.

=== 2022–present: Current fame and House on Eden ===
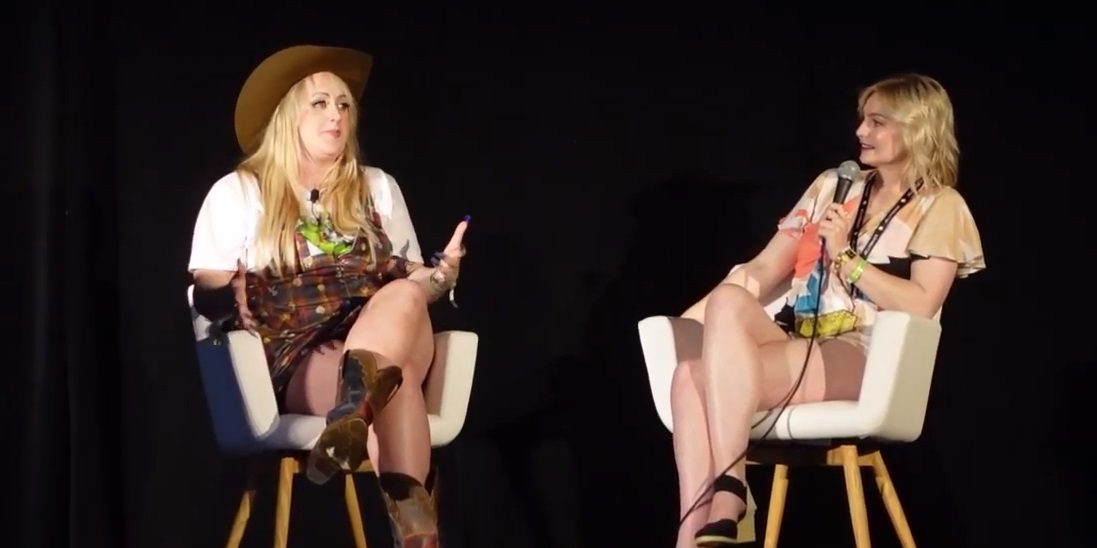
Brittany Broski and Collins at Vidcon 2022

On March 10, 2022, she made an appearance on Breakfast Television. In her interview with Breakfast Television, Collins talked about how she wants to get into acting, stating, "I definitely do want this to be somewhat of a stepping stone, and I'm trying to get more into, like, the traditional space into TV and maybe movies." Collins attended VidCon 2022, which was held at the Anaheim Convention Center from June 22–25, 2022. It was the first VidCon since the COVID-19 pandemic. Collins was featured in the music video for Nickelback's song "San Quentin", which was released on September 14, 2022. On November 18, 2022, Nickelback invited Collins on stage to perform their song, "Rockstar" with them in Sayreville, New Jersey.

In 2023, Collins launched her clothing brand, "Otto By Kris". Collins was a presenter for the 2023 Juno Awards where she helped promote Nickelback's induction into the Canadian Music Hall of Fame. The awards ceremony took place on March 13, 2023. Collins starred in a web series titled, Ginormo! The series had six episodes and was uploaded to Steven He's YouTube channel. The series premiered on May 12, 2023. She attended VidCon 2023 and vlogged her experience on her YouTube channel. Collins was nominated for a Streamy award in the Comedy category for the 13th Annual Streamy Awards.

In June 2024, Collins started a second channel, Kallmekris2, and a collab channel with her partner, Caleb Phelps "oompaville", called NonstopPsyop (later renamed to SourBoys, which is also the name of their candy company). In 2025, Collins started a podcast and ghost-hunting YouTube channel, Can't Sleep, with Celina Myers. Collins and Meyers originally met in 2020 and have made various ghost-hunting or paranormal related videos together. The two have frequently collaborated with the YouTuber duo Sam and Colby on multiple ghost hunting videos. In 2024, Collins starred in, produced, and directed a found-footage horror film, House on Eden, alongside Celina Myers and Jason-Christopher Mayer. Later, in May 2025, RLJE Films and Shudder acquired the rights to the film. The film was released on July 25, 2025, exclusively to movie theatres.

== Personal life ==
Collins and her past boyfriend, Aaron, met at a barbecue party in 2015 and dated for six years. In late 2021, Collins confirmed via TikTok that they had broken up, saying that the two of them remained good friends but "just grew apart". In May 2021, Collins posted a video on YouTube discussing her struggles with mental health.

In a 2021 YouTube Q&A video, Collins was asked if she was "a member or ally of the LGBTQ [community]", to which she responded that she was both, saying she had "never had a label for myself necessarily. I love whoever I love [...] girl, guy or whatever, I'm not opposed to any of it, so I guess that's pan, most people would say, but I don't necessarily have like a label."

On April 26, 2023, Collins posted a video talking about her experiences with being stalked, including having drones fly into her backyard and men coming up to her front door. Because of this invasion of her privacy and fear for her safety she has decided to move to a new location. In November 2023, Collins revealed that she was in a relationship with the YouTuber Oompaville. In April 2025, they got married.

Collins announced that she is expecting a baby girl. At the time of the announcement, she was 20 weeks pregnant. The announcement was made in November 2026. Her daughter is expected to be born in March 2027.

== Filmography ==
=== Film ===
Year	Title	Role	Ref.	Notes
2025	House on Eden	Kris		Also director, writer and producer

=== Television ===
Year	Title	Role	Ref.	Notes
2022	Kids in the Hall	YMCA Group Leader		

=== Web ===
Year	Title	Role	Ref.	Notes
2022	ADXM	Woman in Red		Short film
2023	Ginormo!	Lady Spigh		6 episodes

=== Podcast ===
Year	Title	Ref.	Notes
2025–present	Can't Sleep		Co-host with Celina Myers

=== Music videos ===
Year	Title	Role	Ref.	Notes
2022	"San Quentin" by Nickelback	Herself		

== Awards and nominations ==
=== Streamy Awards ===
Year	Nominee / work	Award	Result	Ref.
2022	KallMeKris	Breakout creator	Nominated	
2022	KallMeKris	Comedy	Nominated	
2022	Sam and Colby, KallMeKris, Celina SpookyBoo - Our Unexplainable Night at Crescent Hotel	Collaboration	Nominated	
2023	KallMeKris	Comedy	Nominated	

== See also ==
- List of most-followed TikTok accounts
- List of YouTubers
