= MrBallen =

American internet storyteller and former Navy SEAL (born 1988)

- Born: Jonathan Bartlett Allen; October 1, 1988 (age 38); Quincy, Massachusetts, U.S.
- Education: North Quincy High School; UMass Amherst (BA)
- Occupations: Internet personality Storyteller; Podcaster; US Navy SEAL (formerly)
- Known for: Storytelling, charity work, military service (retired veteran)

YouTube information
- Channel: MrBallen
- Genres: True crime; mystery; horror; thriller
- Military career
- Branch: United States Navy
- Unit: SEAL Team Two
- Awards: Purple Heart, Navy Commendation Medal with a "V" device

Jonathan Bartlett Allen (born October 1, 1988), known professionally as MrBallen, is an American internet personality and a former United States Navy SEAL. He is best known for his victim-oriented true crime stories and mysteries on YouTube. He co-founded Ballen Studios, and the exclusive rights to his podcast MrBallen Podcast: Strange, Dark and Mysterious Stories were licensed to Amazon Music in September 2022. As of February 2024, the podcast is freely available across multiple platforms including YouTube, Amazon Music, TikTok, and Spotify, among others.

== Early life ==
Allen was born in Quincy, Massachusetts to Jessie Thuma and Scott Allen, a reporter and editor with The Boston Globe. He graduated from North Quincy High School in 2006. That year, he attended UMass Amherst for one semester before dropping out. He later returned to UMass Amherst and graduated with a bachelor's degree in philosophy in 2010.

== Personal life ==
He was raised Catholic and met his wife, Amanda, in college. He is the father of three children.

Allen mentioned in an autobiographical video that his family put academic pressure on him and highly values academic achievement.

Allen's sister Evan Allen was a reporter for The Boston Globe who won a 2021 Pulitzer Prize for Investigative Reporting. She left the Globe in December 2023 to become the full-time Head of Ballen Studios.

Allen was ranked 21st on the 2026 Forbes Top Creators list, with reported earnings of $24 million.

== Career ==
=== Military service ===
After graduating from the UMass Amherst, Allen visited a recruiting office in Quincy, Massachusetts and enlisted in the United States Navy, intending to become a Navy SEAL. Allen joined SEAL Team Two in Virginia Beach in 2012. During his service, he was deployed to Afghanistan and later South America. In 2014, his team was attacked in Afghanistan and a grenade hit Allen, with shrapnel impacting his hips and legs. He was medically retired from the Navy in 2017.

=== YouTube and TikTok ===
Allen launched his YouTube channel in 2020 and began filming true crime and mysteries. He attracts an audience of over ten million subscribers on the platform. The YouTube channel averages 40 million monthly views. He was noted for his storytelling style that builds suspense throughout his videos.

Allen started experimenting with TikTok the same year he started his YouTube channel in 2020. His first viral video was about the Dyatlov Group. The video gained five million views the same day it was posted, prompting him to make additional TikToks about other unsolved mysteries.

In October 2022, Allen was nominated for four YouTube Streamy Awards, in the Creator of the Year, Breakout Creator, and Podcast Categories. He received the most nominations for a first-time nominee. Additionally, Allen and his nonprofit organization, MrBallen Foundation, were nominated for the Creator for Social Good Award.

== Awards and honors ==
Allen’s awards include:

1st row	Purple Heart	Navy and Marine Corps Commendation Medal w/ Combat “V”	Navy and Marine Corps Achievement Medal
2nd row	Combat Action Ribbon	Navy Good Conduct Medal w/ 1 Service Star	National Defense Service Medal
3rd row	Afghanistan Campaign Medal w/ 1 campaign star	Global War on Terrorism Service Medal	NATO Medal for Service with ISAF

== See also ==
- List of United States Navy SEALs
