= House on Eden =

2025 American horror film

- Official release poster
- Directed by: Kris Collins
- Written by: Kris Collins
- Produced by: Kris Collins; Jason-Christopher Mayer; Celina Myers
- Starring: Kris Collins; Celina Myers; Jason-Christopher Mayer
- Cinematography: Jason-Christopher Mayer; Adam Myers
- Edited by: Jason-Christopher Mayer
- Production company: Spooky AF
- Distributed by: RLJE Films; Shudder
- Release date: July 25, 2025
- Running time: 78 minutes
- Country: United States
- Language: English
- Budget: $10,000
- Box office: $455,830

House on Eden is a 2025 American found footage horror film directed, written, produced, and starring Kris Collins, in her feature directorial debut. The film follows a trio of ghost hunting vloggers who encounter an ancient spirit in an abandoned house deep in the woods. The film was released in the United States on July 25, 2025, by RLJE Films and Shudder. Reception for House on Eden was negative.

== Plot ==
A team of ghost hunting vloggers—lead host Kris, co-host Celina and cameraman Jay—go on a road trip to film an episode at a cemetery for their YouTube channel. Though their spirits are initially high, Kris upsets everyone when she reveals she has not been driving them to the cemetery Celina researched, but to a different haunted location she discovered on the internet: the secluded "House on Eden Road."

Through her research, Kris has learned that the house has been long-abandoned, and that a local woman went missing nearly sixty years earlier. Kris has hopes that its unknown status and the forcibly unscripted nature of the investigation will launch their channel to new levels of popularity. While Celina and Jay are displeased she did not consult them, they eventually agree to go along; they are soon forced to abandon their van and find the house on foot due to its secluded location.

The team film b-roll footage in the forest as they walk to the house, and find signs that people have recently been in the area, including the charred remains of a recent bonfire. They also briefly see something in the distance on their cameras, but dismiss it as "nothing."

The group reaches the house after nightfall, finding it to be a large manor in immaculate condition, as though someone still lives there. They find artwork of the mythological figure "Lilith" on the walls, along with seeing her name carved above an upstairs bedroom door. Kris researches the name and learns that Lilith is a dark spirit who pranks men and targets pregnant women.

Jay realizes that he dropped one of the team's cameras outside. He and Celina go out to find it. After a brief argument, Celina subtly accuses Jay of having an unprofessional crush on Kris. Meanwhile, Kris briefly sees a seemingly-spectral woman in a white nightgown before being knocked down by an unseen force. Jay and Celina return and find Kris unconscious. They convince her to go back to their van, but they suddenly all fall unconscious. They awaken the next morning in a panic. Kris convinces the team they need to stay, believing their shared blackout is evidence of real paranormal activity.

The team set up cameras and begin filming for their episode, getting unforeseen results from their efforts to reach any present spirits. Celina sleepwalks and briefly shows signs of possession, while Kris is isolated and targeted by the supernatural entities multiple times, though retains no memory after each incident. Celina and Jay are disturbed by the events, and by Kris's increasingly dismissive attitude towards them.

Jay leaves the house after an argument and vanishes; Celina and Kris find his camera outside. After an argument, Kris reveals that she is pregnant before storming away. Celina watches through Kris and Jay's video footage, noting the mysterious woman in the nightgown watching Kris in a convenience store they visited earlier, and witnessing Jay being attacked by unseen figures after he stormed off. Celina is attacked by an unseen force, and Kris later discovers her in a trance, tearing into her wrist with her fingernails.

The woman in the nightgown appears and begins to chase Kris throughout the house. Kris flees into the attic where the woman, now nude, suddenly appears and knocks her out. The woman cuts her throat and bleeds out over the top of Kris, who awakens possessed. Kris walks outside and finds a large group of nude cultists gathered around a massive bonfire. They strip Kris's clothing off and rub her with blood from Jay and Celina's corpses. The group all raise their hands in salute around the fire as the footage abruptly ends.

== Cast ==
- Kris Collins as Kris, Jay's boss and Celina's best friend. She is revealed to be pregnant. She is soon possessed by Lilith and welcomed into her cult.
- Celina Myers as Celina, the second in command to Kris. She is shown with signs of possession.
- Jason-Christopher Mayer as Jay, Kris's cameraman and Celina's best friend. He also had a crush on Kris.
- Carrie Kidd as Clerk
- Barb Thomas as Lilith, a demon who possesses Kris and Celina. She also was responsible for the deaths of Celina and Jay.

== Production and release ==
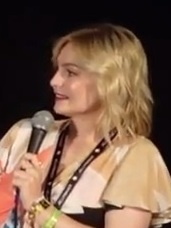
KallMeKris in 2022

Kris Collins and Jason-Christopher Mayer announced at VidCon 2023 that they are working on a horror film, but at the time, there were no plans for a horror film yet. A few months following the announcement, Collins came up with an idea for a film. She started sending voice memos to Mayer and Myers. They wrote an outline for the film. After a delay, principal photography commenced in Texas in July 2024 on a $10,000 budget.

On May 27, 2025, RLJE Films and Shudder acquired the film distribution rights to the film, and released the film in the United States on July 25, 2025.

== Reception ==
On the review aggregator website Rotten Tomatoes, 36% of 25 critics' reviews are positive, with an average rating of 5.1/10. The website's consensus reads: "A reliance on cheap jump scares and well-worn tropes leave House on Eden a forgettable and creatively exhausted found footage experience." Richard Whittaker of The Austin Chronicle gave the film a one and a half of five stars, and stated "What House on Eden re-enforces is the disappointing realization that, 27 years since Blair Witch and over two decades since the first episode of Ghost Hunters debuted on SyFy, this genre has evolved so little".

Carla Hay of Culture Mix wrote "If you want to see a weak, pointless, and dull imitation of 1999's 'found footage' classic horror film The Blair Witch Project, then look no further than the idiotic and unoriginal House on Eden. And be prepared to possibly fall asleep from boredom". Matt Donato of IGN wrote in his review "Collins’ feature-length debut is a 78-minute purgatory that'll have you begging for something, anything of note to happen". Hannah Rose of CBR wrote "As it is, though, House on Eden is typical screenlife fare, a modern-day Blair Witch, right down to its flaws and virtues".
