= Sheena Melwani =

Canadian-American social media personality (born 1983)

- Born: Sheena Melwani; September 1, 1983 (age 42); Montreal, Quebec
- Years active: 2007–present

Instagram information
- Page: Sheena Melwani
- Followers: 2.9 million

TikTok information
- Page: Sheena Melwani
- Followers: 10 million

YouTube information
- Channel: Sheena Melwani
- Genres: Music; comedy
- Subscribers: 2.37 million
- Views: 2.43 billion
- Last updated: July 26, 2026
- Website: www.sheenamelwani.com

Sheena Melwani (born September 1, 1983) is a Canadian-American singer-songwriter and social media personality. She is known for her singing cover videos in which her husband, Dinesh, interjects with witty commentary.

== Early life ==
Sheena Melwani was born on September 1, 1983, in Montreal, Quebec. Her grandfather was a musician and she frequently sang at family and religious events.

== Career ==
In 2007, Melwani moved to Natick, Massachusetts. She sang the national anthem at Fenway Park in 2009 and performed live shows while pregnant with her first child. Melwani, who had wanted to be a young mother, took time off of music for the next decade to raise her children. She began recording again after her daughter entered kindergarten.

During the COVID-19 pandemic, Melwani turned to music to keep herself connected with others. She began singing live three times a week on her Facebook page. After one online session, she wanted to record a song to post on Instagram, which ended up being "If the World Was Ending" by JP Saxe. During her cover, her husband, Dinesh, interjected with witty comments, and the couple had so much fun that they decided to upload it to TikTok in May 2020. The video went viral, and Melwani began uploading more covers with Dinesh interrupting. In April 2021, she signed with WME, already having been signed with Brillstein Entertainment Partners. She then sang the national anthem during Game 2 of the 2024 NBA Finals.

== Personal life ==
Melwani has two children, a son and daughter, with her husband, Dinesh, who is dubbed in her videos as "The Real Indian Dad".

== Awards and nominations ==
Year	Award	Category	Result	Ref.
2022	Streamy Awards	Short Form	Won	
