= Celina Myers =

Canadian social media personality, author and actress

- Born: February 20, 1994 (age 32)
- Occupations: Social media personality; author; actress; comedian
- Years active: 2015–present
- Spouse: Adam Myers (m. 2013)
- Children: 1

TikTok information
- Page: CelinaSpookyBoo
- Genres: Comedy; paranormal
- Followers: 28.6 million

YouTube information
- Channel: CelinaSpookyBoo
- Genres: Paranormal; reaction; true crime; vlog
- Subscribers: 3.46 million
- Views: 787.4 million
- Last updated: August 30, 2026

Celina Myers, also known as CelinaSpookyBoo (born February 20, 1994), is a Canadian social media personality, author, actress, and beauty entrepreneur. She first gained notoriety in 2019 for posting videos of her sleepwalking on TikTok. As of June 2026, she has 28.6 million followers on TikTok and 3.43 million subscribers on YouTube, where she posts ghost hunting and other paranormal-related videos.

Myers frequently collaborates with fellow creator Kris Collins; in 2025, they starred together in the horror film House on Eden, which Myers also produced. Her most recent novel is the vampire romance Hollow, published by Hanover Square Press, which reached number four on the New York Times hardcover bestsellers list.

== Early life ==
Myers grew up in Woodstock, Ontario.

== Career ==
In 2016, Myers released her first book, The Home Reader, a nonfiction memoir about her paranormal journey. Two years later, she wrote her first novel, The Haunting of Clandestine House, in four days; the following year, she self-published the book. Indigo Books and Music picked up the book for traditional publishing in 2024.

In 2019, she self-published Blackwick Falls: The Marked Witch, a novel featuring a 19-year-girl who, after the passing of her mother, discovers that she is a witch. Her following began to grow in 2020 when she posted a video of herself sleepwalking, having accidentally locked herself out of her hotel room naked.

In 2020, she created a consumer makeup brand, BeautyXBoo Cosmetics. Under this brand, she first released an eyeshadow palette under her own name, and in September of 2020, released her first collection, Do You Wanna Watch A Scary Movie?; two more collections, You're the Shit and #YouGotThis released later that year.

Myers made her on-screen acting debut in the 2023 Lifetime television film Would You Kill for Me? The Mary Bailey Story. That same year, she created SpookyBoo's Night Frights, an audiobook series for Audible.

In March 2025, Myers started a podcast and ghost-hunting YouTube channel, Can't Sleep, with Kris Collins. The two creators met in 2020 and began collaborating on paranormal ghost-hunting videos. The two have frequently collaborated with paranormal investigators Sam and Colby.

In May of that year, RLJE Films and Shudder acquired the film distribution rights to the found-footage horror film House on Eden, which Myers starred in and produced; the movie was filmed in one week in July the year before. In July 2025, the movie released in theaters, and grossed more than $450,000 at the box office.

In January 2026, she made an appearance on The Social talk show. That same month, Hanover Square Press traditionally published Hollow, Myers' vampire romance novel. It reached number four on the New York Times hardcover fiction bestsellers list.

In April, she starred in the Tubi-exclusive supernatural docuseries The Haunted Estate with her husband, Adam. The second season was released six months later.

== Personal life ==
Myers has ADHD and Ménière's disease. Since 2013, she has been married to Adam Myers. They have one child together, Remi, who was born in 2025.

== Filmography ==
=== Film ===
Year	Title	Role	Ref.	Notes
2025	House on Eden	Celina		Also producer and camera operator

=== Television ===
Year	Title	Role	Ref.	Notes
2023	Would You Kill for Me? The Mary Bailey Story	Susan		Lifetime TV movie
2026	The Haunted Estate	Herself		

=== Podcast ===
Year	Title	Ref.	Notes
2015–23	The Haunted Estate		
2025–present	Can't Sleep		Co-host with Kris Collins

== Bibliography ==
=== Memoir ===
- The Home Reader (2016)

=== Fiction ===
- The Haunting of Clandestine House (2024; independently published 2019)
- Blackwick Falls: The Marked Witch (2019)
- Hollow (2026; independently published 2022)

=== Audiobook ===
- SpookyBoo's Night Frights (2023)

== Awards and nominations ==
=== Streamy Awards ===
Year	Nominee / work	Award	Result	Ref.
2022	Sam and Colby, KallMeKris, Celina SpookyBoo - Our Unexplainable Night at Crescent Hotel	Collaboration	Nominated	

== See also ==
- List of YouTubers
