= Sam and Colby =

American YouTuber duo (born 1996 and 1997)

- Born: Samuel John Golbach; November 27, 1996 (age 29); Cole Robert Brock; January 2, 1997 (age 29)
- Education: Blue Valley High School
- Occupation: YouTubers

TikTok information
- Page: Sam and Colby
- Followers: 5.7 million

YouTube information
- Channel: Sam and Colby
- Years active: 2014–present
- Genres: Paranormal; vlog; exploring; comedy
- Subscribers: 16 million
- Views: 2.5 billion
- Last updated: July 23, 2026

Sam Golbach (born November 1996) and Colby Brock (born January 1997) are an American YouTuber duo. They are best known for their paranormal investigations.

== History ==
=== 2014–2015: Meeting and Vine ===
Golbach and Brock met in middle school band class. They did not become friends until shortly after they both joined the Blue Valley High School marching band. During summer band camp, they bonded over having a crush on the same drum major. In one of their earliest videos: "How did we meet?", Golbach and Brock explain that they were shy, awkward band kids who wanted to step out of their comfort zone. Their content originally centered on performing public pranks.

The pair's videos initially gained prominence on Vine. Their first YouTube video: "Intro video", released on November 13, 2014. Early content included making vlogs of their everyday lives and following various social media trends. After Vine was deactivated in 2016, they began exclusively uploading videos onto YouTube.

=== 2015–2018: Urban exploring and arrest ===
In April 2015, Golbach and Brock uploaded a video titled "Our first haunted experience", a school project about them going to an abandoned haunted house after failing to get to a friend's party due to their car breaking down. The video ended with both Golbach and Brock becoming possessed by the house's demon. The video's popularity led to a rise in similar urban exploration-style content. They began making urban exploration videos of locations in Kansas, New Jersey, and Mexico. Often featuring guests, these videos followed the same premise as their school project, exploring real places that were reputed to be dangerous, abandoned, or haunted. Some of the most famous places they visited included the Devil's Tunnel in New Jersey, Satan's Castle in Ukraine, and the RMS Queen Mary in California.

While visiting an abandoned school in Florida in 2018, they were caught by police and arrested at gunpoint. Their mugshots went viral on social media. Their experience in jail lasted two days, with Golbach referring to it as "the most traumatic experience of my life". He stated that when a convict saw his and Brock's faces, the convict said: "you're going to fit here real well". Both stated publicly that:

"We were at gunpoint, on the ground, being shouted at by everyone. Told not to move. Imagine it. We're just two teenagers from Kansas, going about their lives doing something they love and then all the sudden, they're about to be arrested."

After this experience, Golbach and Brock abandoned urban explorations altogether. Despite that, four sporadic videos in their "25×25" series were uploaded while they were filming in Panama, and one final haunted video from Paramount.

=== 2018–2021: Various content changes ===
Golbach and Brock decided to change their series and focus instead on haunted investigations. Inspired by the paranormal television show Ghost Adventures, Golbach and Brock investigated haunted hotels, castles, mountains, forests, and other places to find out if those places were haunted. After getting in trouble for recording and attempting to perform a ritual in the "Ritual Tunnel" cave, Golbach and Brock took a brief hiatus.

In 2020, during the COVID-19 pandemic, Golbach and Brock hosted a series where they brought celebrity guests to haunted places. In two episodes, they treasure hunted at the Cerro Gordo and Custer's Last Stand historical sites.

In 2021, Golbach and Brock began a new series titled "25×25". The series consisted of 25 episodes where Golbach and Brock completed 25 of their biggest goals before turning 25. The episodes included the pair traveling to Alaska, trying scuba diving, and attempting to live on an island. The final episode of 25×25 was filmed at Chernobyl, in a fulfillment of the duo's biggest dream.

=== 2021–present: Return to haunted investigations ===
Following the lukewarm reaction to 25x25, Golbach and Brock returned to haunted investigations. This time, however, they included a full scope of guests in every episode. They also began using more professional paranormal equipment, like an EMF detector, a REM pod, and a spirit box. Their channel focuses on investigating various haunted places from around the world.

== Episode structure ==
A typical episode begins with an introduction of what the location and objective is. Golbach and Brock then introduce the guests and attend a short walkthrough of the location with the owner of the place. They interview the owner in an attempt to learn more about its mystery. They investigate each room and attempt to communicate with the spirit, occasionally bringing on a medium or a witch to help communication. Golbach and Brock will also conduct these tests on themselves. In an episode at the White Hill Mansion, Golbach and Brock hired a hypnotist to put them in a trance.

When the place has a mystery, Golbach and Brock attempt to solve the mystery of that location. According to the paranormal community, the pair have solved three longstanding unsolved mysteries. Their first was at the Villisca axe-murder house, in which they found the name of the killer. The second one was at the new conjuring house, in which they found out that the Smurl family had been lying about the spirits for the entire time and that Ed and Lorraine were told to not say anything to the public to keep the lie alive. The third mystery was that of the S.K. Pierce mansion, in which they found the killer of the girls, and the mystery of an unnamed girl whose pelvis bone had been found in the basement.

== Guests ==
A list of guests that have appeared on their show.

- Nick di Giovanni
- Sofie Dossi
- Faze Rug
- Try Guys
- Celina Myers
- Kris Collins
- Karl Jacobs
- Daz Black
- TommyInnit
- Nihachu
- Wilbur Soot
- George Davidson
- Sturniolo Triplets
- Dangmattsmith
- Quackity
- Dan and Phil

=== Mediums ===
A list of mediums that have appeared in the show.

- Amanda Raye
- Patti Negri
- Ashley Ryan (Pythian Priestess)
- Dylan Bauer (Mystic Dylan)

== Spin-offs ==
=== Hell Week ===
An annual Halloween special that follows Golbach and Brock going to the most haunted places full of demons and dark history only on Halloween.

=== Attachment ===
An eight-part miniseries in which Golbach, Brock, and their guests head to various places that contain meanings of an attachment inside Golbach from the Sallie House.

=== Empath ===
The second part of the Attachment series, in which Golbach and Brock investigate to places that have empathic energy.

=== International Trilogy ===
One-off three-part miniseries in the UK's most haunted locations.

== Personal life ==
Golbach was in relationship with Katrina Stuart between 2017 and 2023. Since summer of 2025, he has been in a relationship with contortionist and internet personality Sofie Dossi.

== Notable works ==
- In 2019, they released their web series, Stranded with Sam and Colby.
- In 2023, they debuted their feature film, Sam and Colby: A Week at The Conjuring House.
- In 2024, they released their second movie, Sam and Colby: The Legends of The Paranormal.
