= Cassey Ho =

American social media fitness entrepreneur

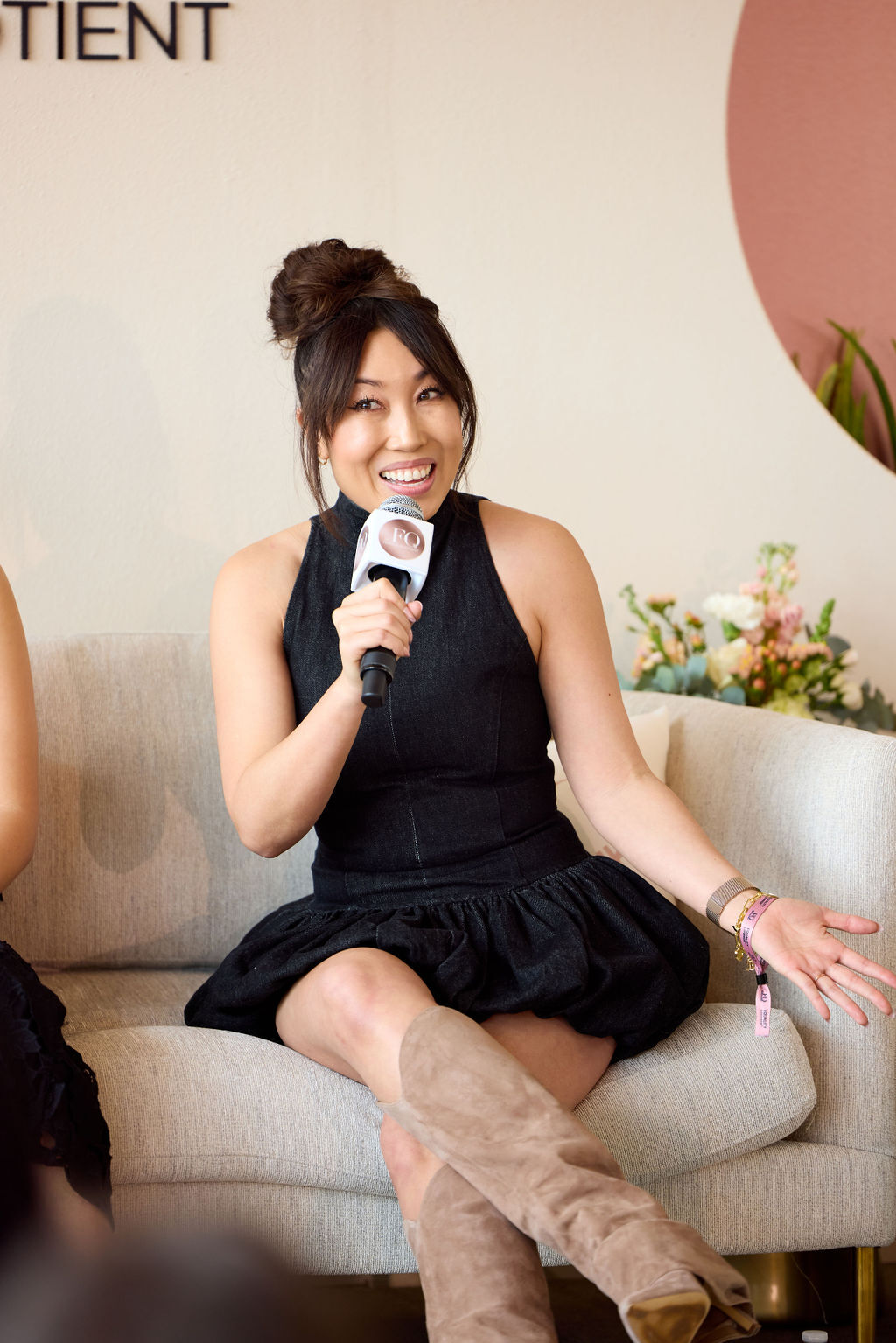
- Ho speaking at SXSW in 2025
- Born: January 16, 1987 (age 39); Los Angeles, California, U.S.
- Education: Whittier College (BS)
- Occupations: Video blogger; social-fitness entrepreneur
- Years active: 2009–present
- Known for: Pilates instruction
- Spouse: Sam Livits (m. 2018)
- Awards: Shorty Award 2013

YouTube information
- Channel: blogilates
- Genre: Fitness
- Subscribers: 11.0 million
- Views: 5.2 billion
- Last updated: December 19, 2025
- Website: www.blogilates.com

Cassey Ho (born January 16, 1987) is an American entrepreneur, fashion designer, inventor, and social media fitness entrepreneur with a YouTube channel and a website that sells fitness apparel. She is the creator of Blogilates, a fitness brand that began as a YouTube channel in 2009 and has since grown into a community-driven brand offering workout videos, activewear, and design-forward fitness products, which are sold exclusively at Target stores nationwide. Cassey has built a global following with over 19 million followers across all platforms and more than 6 billion video views across all channels. Her work has earned her numerous accolades, she received a Shorty Award in the category of social fitness, and was listed in Time's third annual list of "The 25 Most Influential People on the Internet" in 2017.

== Early life and education ==
Ho is a Vietnamese-Chinese American and was born in Los Angeles, California, but grew up in the San Francisco Bay Area. Her parents are Bach Ho and Cuu Ho and she has a sister named Jackelyn, who is a yoga instructor. When she was a teenager, she started her first business called "Cooplex Cookies & Candies," which lasted from 2001 to 2005. Her interest in fitness and nutrition began when she was 16 and discovered Pilates. Ho has also said that it was her "childhood dream to become a fashion designer."

She went to James Logan High School. In 2003, she won the San Francisco Miss Teen Chinatown beauty pageant. She told Asian Fortune that coming from an Asian culture, her parents expected her to choose a career as a doctor or lawyer. When she was 16, she told her father that she wanted to be a fashion designer. Her father, in response, told her that she would fail, make no money, and have no friends. She went to Whittier College on a John Greenleaf Whittier full tuition scholarship with the career aim of becoming a doctor. She graduated in 2009 with a Bachelor of Science in biology.

== Career ==
Ho started her online fitness businesses while she was still in college. In 2007, she was one of 18 winning designers featured at the "Emerging Stars" fashion show that occurred during San Francisco Fashion Week. Ho started posting fitness videos on YouTube in 2009 after she decided to move from Los Angeles, California to Boston, Massachusetts for a full-time job as a fashion buyer. She had been a part-time Pilates instructor and wanted to provide the students she was leaving with online fitness workouts after she moved to Boston. The first video she uploaded to YouTube was called "POP Pilates: Total Body Sculpt video" and she had considerable trouble with its quality, audio, and editing. After she uploaded the video, she received a number of comments requesting more videos on specific workouts for different muscle groups such legs, thighs, and abs, but she didn't pay attention to these requests for months.

Nine months after she moved to Boston to work as a fashion buyer, she decided to quit because she disliked it. She started teaching Pilates classes 12 times a week to pay for her food and rent. She found teaching Pilates this often physically tiring, but because she was not working full-time, she had time to make more workout videos. She began uploading her new videos to YouTube and her views and subscribers began to rapidly increase. She then became a YouTube Partner and her website blogilates.com dramatically increased its web traffic. She also believes that a feature of one of her bags in Shape magazine in 2010 was a contributing factor in the success she has had in her career. After her bag was featured, she realized that she could make money selling bags and went to China to talk to manufacturers of bags. When she started her YouTube channel and began her Internet marketing of clothing, bags, mats, and fitness apparel, she briefly worked with a PR company, but decided she could handle PR for her businesses.

By October 2012, three years after she uploaded her first video to YouTube in 2009, she had 166,000 subscribers on her YouTube channel Blogilates and by January 18, 2014, she reached more than 100 million views on her YouTube channel. By April 2014, her YouTube subscribers had increased to 1.2 million and a month later she had reached 138,000 Twitter followers. By December 2014, her Blogilates channel on YouTube had 1.8 million subscribers, 8 million views a month, 60,000 views a day, and is the top fitness channel on YouTube and by October 2016, her Blogilates channel on YouTube had over 3.2 million subscribers.

Her workout videos are often featured in online newspapers and videos. She is also considered a successful social media marketer who has appeared as an example of a successful social-media fitness entrepreneur in the book Social Media Marketing All-in-One For Dummies and other social media "how to" books. In 2014, Lionsgate's BeFit YouTube channel added Ho to their channel lineup. In an interview with EContent Magazine, Ho stated that she believes that one reason for her success on YouTube is because she keeps her videos "fun and playful."

She was interviewed by Forbes in 2012 as a woman who is rapidly becoming a star on YouTube along with several other women such as Issa Rae and Cassandra Bankson. She has been described as a poster child for Asian American entrepreneurial success on the Internet. At the 2014 Sundance Film Festival, she led yogilates workout sessions at the YouTube lounge.

In 2012, she won Fitness Magazine's Fitterati blogger awards in the category of "Best Healthy Living Blog." Sharecare also ranked her as the number 2 online influencer making a difference in the world of fitness just behind Jillian Michaels. In 2013, Ho won a Shorty Award in the category of social fitness.

In January 2014, MarketWatch reported that Ho was first on their top 10 list of Social HealthMarkers on fitness by Sharecare. In August, The Wall Street Journal reported that Ho's Blogilates YouTube channel was averaging almost 8 million views a month and that it is the top-ranked fitness channel on YouTube. In September, Seventeen magazine announced that its October issue would be its first YouTube issue featuring 30 well known YouTubers, with Ho to present her workout routine.

=== Clothing collections: Bodypop and Popflex ===
In August 2014, Ho released "Bodypop", an activewear clothing collection. According to Ro Kalonaros, writing for Shape, "The line is a mix between high fashion and practical—think peplum and bold prints." At the release of her activewear collection, Ho also released a music video of three female athletes wearing Ho's activewear. In January 2016, Ho launched the first collection of a new line, "Popflex".

In 2024, after Taylor Swift wore Popflex's Pirouette skort for a YouTube short, the item sold out in 15 minutes. The skort made another appearance in her official music video for "I Can Do It With A Broken Heart". The attention for the item had attracted copycat designs being sold on online marketplaces such as Shein and Amazon multiple times. Despite having patents filed in 2025, Israeli manufacturer Gottex allegedly copied the skort's design and sold theirs in Nordstrom. After Ho's team sent Gottex and Nordstrom cease and desist letters, Gottex's lawyers threatened legal actions instead if she pursued "any further infringement allegations."

== Body-shaming response ==
In April 2015, Ho responded to an increasing number negative comments about her body by creating a video that quickly went viral. In her YouTube video The "Perfect" Body, Ho receives negative social media messages about her body. She is then presented with tools that allow her to "photoshop" her body into a socially perceived ideal body image. However, when she looks into a mirror, she is dismayed by what she sees. Ho's stated intent in creating this video was to respond to cyber-bullying with the goal "...to show that cyber-bullying and mean comments really affect people, and to think before you say something. I hope that people do the exact opposite after seeing this video, which is enlighten everyone around them with positivity."

== Personal life ==
On August 22, 2017, Ho announced her engagement to longtime boyfriend Sam Livits on her official Instagram page. They married on October 6, 2018. Cassey is the CEO and Head Designer of POPFLEX, while Sam is the COO. Together, they have a dog, a pomapoo named Sir George the Magnificent.
