= Mina Le =

YouTuber and podcaster

YouTube information
- Channel: Mina Le
- Years active: 2020–present
- Genres: Fashion; pop culture
- Subscribers: 1.77 million
- Views: 150 million
- Last updated: January 30, 2026

Mina Le is a YouTuber, podcaster, and content creator who focuses on culture and fashion history. She is known for her YouTube video essays, which discuss the impacts and implications of fashion and pop culture. Le is also known for her distinct personal style, which draws from vintage clothing throughout multiple decades.

== Early life ==
Le grew up in Maryland, just outside Washington, D.C. She is a second-generation Vietnamese American. Her mother inspired her love for fashion history and vintage clothing. Le's mother designed and sewed her own clothes throughout college and owned a consignment store before having Le. Le played dress-up with her mother's clothes and mimicked her habit of making fashion mood boards out of magazine clippings.

Before pivoting to her current fashion, history, and content-creation career, Le thought she would end up working in politics on Capitol Hill.

In college, Le studied media and communications, as well as politics and international relations in Melbourne, Australia. She credits this move to Australia with launching her interest in fashion as a career.

After college, Le moved to New York City, where she worked as a fashion intern. She disliked the position, as she was a "a mule carrying around garment bags for stylists and getting coffee." After that experience, Le began to pivot into the film industry and worked a documentary internship.

== Career ==
In late 2017, she began using Instagram under the moniker @sourpuffgrl and amassed a considerable following.

After losing her job at the beginning of the COVID-19 pandemic, Le moved back to her mother's house in Maryland, where she watched a lot of video essays. This inspired her to create her own YouTube channel. On May 23, 2020, Le posted her first YouTube video essay, "Why Atonement (2007) deserved an Oscar for costume design." Her early content focused on costume analysis, but she widened her scope to discuss fashion history, culture, and entertainment. Each of her videos are meticulously compiled, with Le writing a detailed script and drawing from the New York Public Library's resources. Her channel blew up after a video on the historical accuracy of Disney Princess dresses, which grew her following from 600 to around 60,000. She credits this initial viral moment as a key turning point in her career, making her realize that content creation could be an economically viable space.

In March 2023, Le began her podcast, High Brow, where she takes a more in-depth look at the topics of her videos and brings on guests knowledgeable about the subject.

Le has a distinctive personal style that draws from fashion history and vintage styles. She estimates that her wardrobe is seventy-five percent vintage, a large portion of which is thrifted. Le mixes these vintage pieces with modern-day, "coquettish" clothes. In an interview with Vogue, Le called her style "theatrical, romantic, and whimsical," but also emphasized her desire to not be "contained by any particular aesthetic."

Le has been photographed and interviewed for multiple Vogue articles. On February 7, 2023, Le was photographed for "Eccentric Style Ruled at the Manhattan Vintage Show." On March 8, 2023, Le was interviewed for "For These Women of Color, Historical Dressing Is a Modern Art Form," where she discusses her personal style and inspirations.

As of 2023, Le is signed to IMG Models and WME. As of 2025, Mina Le has reached 1.68 million subscribers on YouTube.

== Personal life ==
Le has a cat named Prada.
