= Retirement House =

Content creator collective

Retirement House is a social media collective of elderly TikTok personalities based out of California, United States. It is also the name of the mansion in which the content is filmed. It is a collaborative content-creation house, allowing different actors and content creators to make videos together easily. The project was created and produced by Flighthouse Media, a subsidiary of Create Music Group

== History ==
Retirement House was launched in September 2021 by Adi Azran and Brandon Chase.

The cast of Retirement House consisted primarily of actors in their 70s and 80s, who would participated in scripted sketches during scheduled production sessions rather than living together full time.

In 2024, cast member Reatha Grey who died at the age of 75,previously stated in an interview to the New York Times in 2022 that participating in Retirement House had helped combat isolation among those involved in the project

Following cast turnover over time due to health issues, Flighthouse has continued to introduce new performers to continue the format.

== Members ==
- Larry portrayed by Monterey Morrissey
- Curtis portrayed by Jerry Boyd
- Mabel portrayed by Gaylynn Baker
- Eugene portrayed by Chuck Lacy
- Rose portrayed by Reatha “Rose” Grey (deceased)
- Bubbe portrayed by Patty Yulish
