= Sidetalk =

New York City-based webseries

- Sidetalk logo
- Years active: 2019–present

Instagram information
- Page: Sidetalk
- Genres: Comedy; Man-on-the-street
- Followers: 2 million (October 13, 2026)

Sidetalk is an American Instagram show created by Trent Simonian and Jack Byrne. The show utilizes a man-on-the-street technique to interview people across New York City with each episode being approximately one minute long, and is noted for its surreal and/or humorous interviews.

== History ==
Trent Simonian, a graduate of Malibu High School, and Jack Byrne, a graduate of Xavier High School, started the show in the fall of 2019 during their first semester as students at New York University. They had first met after being accepted into NYU during their senior year of high school through mutual friends. Prior to co-creating Sidetalk, Simonian hosted a similar interview-style show in high school called Shark TV, while Byrne interned for The Fat Jewish for five years beginning at age 14.

The duo signed to Brillstein Entertainment Partners and WME in April 2021.

The show received a nomination for the 2021 Streamy Awards in the Indie Show category and two nominations for the 2022 Streamy Awards in the Show of the Year and Unscripted Series categories.

Simonian and Byrne were selected to the Forbes 30 Under 30 2024 list for Social Media.

Sidetalk launched its podcast, We Outside by Sidetalk, in April 2026. Episodes consist of Simonian and guests walking and talking in New York City.

=== Bing Bong ===
On October 21, 2021, Simonian and Byrne released an episode titled "Knicks Season Opener" featuring New York Knicks fans celebrating the team's opening night double-overtime victory over the Boston Celtics. One of the fans in the video, Jordie Bloom, says "Bing Bong" into the microphone, a reference to the New York City Subway "doors closing" warning sound which is used at the beginning of each Sidetalk episode. While the phrase itself had been previously popularized in earlier Sidetalk videos, by rapper Nems and others in episodes from Coney Island, it quickly became a rallying cry for the Knicks after the "Knicks Season Opener" video went viral. The phrase was picked up by the official New York Knicks Twitter account, Knicks announcer Mike Breen, and Knicks forward Evan Fournier, and was featured on the cover of the sports page of the New York Daily News. “Bing Bong” even received two write-in votes in the 2021 New York City mayoral election. The phrase was further popularized by the viral "Bing Bong" trend on TikTok where users would recreate various different quotes from Sidetalk. Celebrities including President Joe Biden, The Jonas Brothers, John Legend, Lil Nas X, Olivia Rodrigo, Jack Harlow, and Avril Lavigne joined in on the trend.

== Notable guests ==
The following notable individuals appeared on the show as interviewees, unless otherwise noted:

- Drake, as guest host
- Travis Scott, as guest host
- ASAP Rocky, as guest host
- Cardi B, as guest host
- Sacha Baron Cohen (as Ali G), as guest host
- Zohran Mamdani, as guest host
- Druski, as guest host
- Bobby Shmurda, as guest host
- Kai Cenat, as guest host
- Big Body Bes, as guest host
- Lil Uzi Vert
- Casey Neistat
- Ice Spice
- Jordan Clarkson
- Michael Rapaport
- David Dobrik
- Rowdy Rebel
- Curtis Sliwa
- Julia Fox
- Wayne Diamond
- Jeremy Lin
- Luke Manley

== Episodes ==
Sidetalk episodes list
No.	Title	Location	Original release date
1	"New York Fashion Week"	SoHo	September 9, 2019
2	"Making Friends"	SoHo	September 15, 2019
3	"San Gennaro"	Little Italy	September 19, 2019
4	"The Village Hemp Shop"	MacDougal Street	September 23, 2019
5	"Fun in Times Square"	Times Square	September 29, 2019
6	"New York Comic Con"	New York Comic Con	October 4, 2019
7	"Climate Change"	Washington Square Park	October 9, 2019
8	"SantaCon"	Midtown	December 14, 2019
9	"Happy Birthday Jonah Hill"	Union Square	December 20, 2019
10	"Squirrels!"	Washington Square Park	January 18, 2020
11	"Leeky Bandz"	Union Square	January 25, 2020
12	"The Park"	Washington Square Park	January 28, 2020
13	"City So Nice They Named It Twice"	Midtown	January 30, 2020
14	"Super Bowl Sunday"	Midtown	February 2, 2020
15	"Introducing Strangers"	Chinatown	February 11, 2020
16	"Valentine's Day"	Union Square	February 14, 2020
17	"Bieber Fever"	Midtown	February 17, 2020
18	"Leap Year"	Midtown	February 29, 2020
19	"Plastic Bag Ban"	Midtown	March 9, 2020
20	"Purim"	Williamsburg	March 11, 2020
21	"Trap Talk"	Midtown	September 5, 2020
22	"Glazed Donuts"	SoHo	September 10, 2020
23	"The Travis Scott Burger"	McDonald's	September 13, 2020
24	"Jesus Gets Attacked"	Union Square	September 17, 2020
25	"Jokertyme"	Washington Square Park	September 20, 2020
26	"Spider Cuz"	Union Square	September 23, 2020
27	"ABG Neal"	Midtown	September 27, 2020
28	"Rapaport Talks Trump"	Washington Square Park	October 4, 2020
29	"New York Ain't Dead"	Times Square	October 9, 2020
30	"Spider Cuz Part 2"	East Village	October 13, 2020
31	"Spider Cuz Takes the Town"	Greenwich Village	October 25, 2020
32	"Trump Rally"	Times Square	October 29, 2020
33	"Halloween with Spider Cuz"	New York	November 1, 2020
34	"Election Night in New York"	New York	November 4, 2020
35	"Party in the Park"	Washington Square Park	November 9, 2020
36	"Spider Cuz Shuts Down the Park"	Washington Square Park	November 13, 2020
37	"Blakk Stakkz"	Lower East Side	November 20, 2020
38	"Anti-Mask Rally"	Washington Square Park	November 25, 2020
39	"Lil Mo Mozzarella"	Little Italy	November 30, 2020
40	"Sidetalk Cribs: Jesus Edition"	Washington Square Park	December 6, 2020
41	"Lil Agz"	East Village	December 13, 2020
42	"Anti-Mask Rally Part 2"	Union Square	December 17, 2020
43	"June Cancun"	Harlem	December 23, 2020
44	"Blakk Stakkz Part 2"	Lower East Side	December 28, 2020
45	"Truck Girl"	SoHo	January 3, 2021
46	"Bitchin Styles"	Midtown	January 16, 2021
47	"Yams Day with A$AP Rocky & A$AP Mob"	New York	January 18, 2021
48	"LeBron"	Times Square	January 24, 2021
49	"Wall St"	Wall Street	January 30, 2021
50	"Snowball Fight"	Washington Square Park	February 3, 2021
51	"Lil Mo for Mayor"	Little Italy	February 9, 2021
52	"Lil Agz Valentine's Day Special"	SoHo	February 14, 2021
53	"Big Body Bes"	East New York	February 20, 2021
54	"Welcome Home Bobby Shmurda"	Union Square	February 24, 2021
55	"Knicks Break .500"	Madison Square Garden	March 5, 2021
56	"Trump Returns to NYC"	Trump Tower	March 14, 2021
57	"ABG Neal Hits the Park"	Washington Square Park	March 22, 2021
58	"Stimmy Special"	SoHo	March 26, 2021
59	"Weed is Legal"	Union Square	April 3, 2021
60	"Coney Island's Finest"	Coney Island	April 10, 2021
61	"Chippi Chippi"	Harlem	April 16, 2021
62	"4/20"	Washington Square Park	April 21, 2021
63	"RIP DMX"	Barclays Center	April 25, 2021
64	"Anti-Vax Rally"	Union Square	May 8, 2021
65	"BkTidalWave"	Union Square	May 21, 2021
66	"World of T-Shirts"	Times Square	May 28, 2021
67	"Knicks Lose"	Madison Square Garden	June 3, 2021
68	"Ray-Dizzle"	Union Square	June 11, 2021
69	"Juneteenth Cookout"	Harlem	June 22, 2021
70	"Water Balloon Fight"	Central Park	June 27, 2021
71	"Coney Island Glizzy Eating Contest"	Coney Island	July 4, 2021
72	"4th of July in Dyckman"	Dyckman Street	July 6, 2021
73	"World of T-Shirts Part 2"	Times Square	July 13, 2021
74	"Pop Smoke Day"	Canarsie	July 21, 2021
75	"Bronx Dominican Day Parade"	The Bronx	July 31, 2021
76	"Blakk Stakkz Part 3"	Lower East Side	August 7, 2021
77	"Bye Bye Cuomo"	Union Square	August 11, 2021
78	"Stoney Mama"	The Bronx	August 21, 2021
79	"Rich Rhymer Cookout"	Harlem	August 25, 2021
80	"Ferris Wheel in Times Square"	Times Square	September 3, 2021
81	"Coney Island Ski Club"	Coney Island	September 10, 2021
82	"Little Italy with Kai Cenat"	Little Italy	September 18, 2021
83	"Lil Mo at San Gennaro"	Little Italy	October 1, 2021
84	"The End of the Bandemic"	Harlem	October 9, 2021
85	"Comic Con with Spider Cuz"	New York Comic Con	October 16, 2021
86	"Knicks Season Opener"	Madison Square Garden	October 21, 2021
87	"Glizzy Patrol with ABG Neal"	Little Italy	November 12, 2021
88	"A Coney Island Thanksgiving"	Coney Island	November 25, 2021
89	"Movie Moe"	East Harlem	December 14, 2021
90	"Big Girl Winter"	Rockefeller Center	December 25, 2021
91	"Meals by Cugine"	Midtown	January 15, 2022
92	"2nd Annual Sidetalk Snowball Fight"	Washington Square Park	January 30, 2022
93	"Spider Cuz Hits Little Italy"	Little Italy	February 5, 2022
94	"June Cancun Takes SoHo"	SoHo	March 6, 2022
95	"Boogie Down Bronx"	The Bronx	April 9, 2022
96	"4/20 Meetup"	Union Square	April 21, 2022
97	"ABG Neal hit the LES"	Lower East Side	May 7, 2022
98	"Bobby for Governor"	Lower East Side	June 12, 2022
99	"Puerto Rican Festival"	Spanish Harlem	June 18, 2022
100	"2nd Annual Sidetalk Water Balloon Fight"	Central Park	June 28, 2022
101	"4th of July in Coney Island"	Coney Island	July 6, 2022
102	"Meals by Cugine Part 2"	Lower East Side	August 4, 2022
103	"Subway Series"	Yankee Stadium	August 24, 2022
104	"Lil Mo & Stace Take the Feast"	Little Italy	October 1, 2022
105	"Halloween Meetup"	Union Square	November 2, 2022
106	"Chippi Chippi Takes Times Square"	Times Square	December 1, 2022
107	"Valentine's Day with Movie Moe"	Lower East Side	February 14, 2023
108	"2nd Annual Sidetalk 4/20 Meetup"	Union Square	April 21, 2023
109	"Knicks Win"	Madison Square Garden	May 11, 2023
110	"Drake Week"	Madison Square Garden	July 27, 2023
111	"Starlets with Drake"	Queens	July 30, 2023
112	"Blakk Stakkz vs. Taylor Swift"	Lower East Side	February 11, 2024
113	"Phuck Philly"	Madison Square Garden	May 3, 2024
114	"Kai Cenat & AMP Take NYC"	Greenwich Village	July 20, 2024
115	"Utopia with Travis Scott"	MetLife Stadium	October 11, 2024
116	"Thanksgiving on the Subway"	New York City Subway and Times Square	November 28, 2024
117	"Christmas with ABG Neal"	Rockefeller Center	December 23, 2024
118	"Valentine's Day with Druski"	Lower East Side	February 13, 2025
119	"Free Advice with Blakk Stakkz"	Lower East Side	March 13, 2025
120	"Truck Girl Part 2"	SoHo	March 24, 2025
121	"Boston Blows"	Madison Square Garden	May 17, 2025
123	"Free Advice with The Rizzler"	New York City Subway	May 28, 2025
124	"Cugine’s Pizza Tour"	Greenwich Village	June 5, 2025
125	"Truck Girl Part 3"	Bowery	July 3, 2025
126	"3rd Annual Sidetalk Snowball Fight"	Washington Square Park	February 24, 2026
130	"Hawk Tuah"	Madison Square Garden	May 1, 2026
132	"Knicks Advance to the Finals"	Madison Square Garden	May 26, 2026
