= The Hacksmith =

Canadian YouTuber (born 1990)

Hacksmith Industries (The Hacksmith)
- Born: James Hobson; February 10, 1990 (age 36); Kitchener, Ontario, Canada
- Occupations: Engineer; YouTuber; Entrepreneur

YouTube information
- Channel: Hacksmith Industries
- Years active: 2006–present
- Subscribers: 15.4 million
- Views: 3.03 billion
- Last updated: 23 February 2026
- Website: www.hacksmith.com

James Hobson (born February 10, 1990), known for his YouTube channel Hacksmith Industries (formerly the Hacksmith), is a Canadian engineer, Entrepreneur and YouTuber.

Hobson is the presenter and prominent figure on the channel and has done a TEDx talk on his aspirations as an engineer. In December 2020, Hobson was awarded a Guinness World Record for his 'lightsaber'. In July 2021, he was awarded another world record for the world's brightest flashlight.

== Hacksmith Industries ==
Hacksmith Industries is known for its "Make It Real" series, where Hobson and his team take fictional items and create real-life replicas, such as an exosuit or lightsaber. Its gas-fueled steampunk-style plasma lightsaber that could reach 4,000 °F (2,200 °C) and cut through metal was awarded a Guinness World Record for the world's first retractable protosaber. The channel also collaborated on projects with companies like Smarter Alloys in 2021. However, the channel's projects are not specifically limited to existing media, such as when it created the previously mentioned flashlight.

In 2019, Hacksmith Industries created a replica of a half-scale Tesla Cybertruck that had the same specifications as the full scale. Around the same year, it moved to a different facility with more equipment for its projects.

From 2020 through 2021, the channel made its first complete set of armor, which was based on Din Djarin's arsenal from the Disney+ streaming series The Mandalorian.

In late 2022, the channel moved to another facility with more open space for testing its projects. The crew later constructed a new series of clean rooms to safely work with liquid oxygen to work on a self-contained version of their lightsaber.

== YouTube career ==
Main channels' statistics (May 14, 2023)
Channel	Subscribers, millions	Views, billions	YouTube Creator Awards		
Channel	Subscribers, millions	Views, billions	YouTube Creator Awards	YouTube Creator Awards	YouTube Creator Awards
Channel	Subscribers, millions	Views, billions	0.1	1	10
Hacksmith Industries	13.6	1.66			2020
Hacksmith VLOGS	0.4	0.024			
Best Hacksmith Clips	0.048	0.00019			
