= VidIQ =

Online Education platform

vidIQ
- Website type: Analytics
- Available in: Various: English; French; Spanish; Russian; Portuguese; Turkish; Vietnamese
- Owners: vidIQ, Inc.
- Founders: Robert Sandie; Todd Troxell
- CEO: Robert Sandie
- Website: vidiq.com
- Registration: Optional
- Launched: 1 July 2011; 15 years ago
- Current status: Active

vidIQ is an online education website that offers video tutorials and analytics on YouTube channel growth. The website also has a Google Chrome extension, which allows users to analyze YouTube analytics data. vidIQ has often been compared with the Google Chrome extension TubeBuddy, which has similar features to vidIQ.

== History ==
vidIQ was founded by Rob Sandie and Todd Troxell in Bethlehem, Pennsylvania in 2011. Sandie and Troxell were originally focused on the distribution issues of the website, however, they later switched to focusing on YouTube analytics. In March 2013, vidIQ appeared at the Founders Den Demo Night. In June 2013, the website was verified by YouTube after passing the YouTube certification program.

In 2016, the hacker group OurMine hacked into multiple big YouTube channels after their passwords were leaked in third-party database dumps. After hacking into accounts, OurMine used vidIQ's ability to modify all of a channel's video titles and descriptions at once to add "Hacked by OurMine". vidIQ took the data breaches "very seriously" and temporarily paused the site's actions relating to the YouTube API. To prevent further breaches, vidIQ reset the passwords for most big YouTubers and implemented a multi-factor authentication feature for when users try to edit video titles and descriptions.

== Reception ==
In May 2020, Manikanta Immanni of BabbleSports reviewed the website and its Google Chrome extension, in which Immanni praised vidIQ for numerous reasons. Mashable listed vidIQ as one of the best ways to grow a YouTube channel.
