= Caleb Marshall =

American fitness personality (born 1993)

- Born: March 18, 1993 (age 33); Marion, Indiana, U.S.
- Education: Indiana University Bloomington (BA)
- Occupations: Social media influencer, fitness trainer, entrepreneur
- Years active: 2014 – present
- Spouse: Cameron Moody (m. 2023)

YouTube information
- Channel: The Fitness Marshall
- Years active: 2014–present
- Subscribers: 7.08 million
- Views: 3.213 billion
- Last updated: January 23, 2026
- Website: thefitnessmarshall.com

Caleb Marshall (born March 18, 1993), popularly known as The Fitness Marshall, is an American fitness instructor and social media influencer. He is known for producing YouTube workout videos that combine dance and aerobic exercise for a broad audience. Comparisons have been made to Richard Simmons, a likeness that Marshall himself embraces.

Marshall started his YouTube channel in October 2014, and by 2018, he had amassed over 1 million followers. His workout video to "Me Too" by Meghan Trainor garnered 1 million views overnight, earning recognition from the singer herself. As of January 2026, The Fitness Marshall has a following of 7 million users on YouTube and 3.8 million on TikTok. Marshall uses his platform to advocate for causes such as The Trevor Project and body positivity. Beyond digital content, Marshall operates Active Booty, an activewear line designed for a diverse range of body sizes.

== Background ==
Marshall was born and raised in Marion, Indiana. From a young age, he exhibited a passion for dance and fitness. He attended Indiana University, where he graduated in 2015 with a Bachelor of Arts in film production. During his time at university, Marshall taught cardio hip-hop classes and rediscovered his love for dance. He began to merge his love for dance with his interest in fitness, laying the groundwork for his future career.

Marshall is openly gay and met Cameron Moody at the university in 2015. The couple became engaged in July 2021 at Drew Scott's home and married in February 2023. After more than a decade together, the couple filed jointly for divorce in April 2026.
