= Josh Helfgott =

American TikToker

- Occupations: Activist; Content creator
- Years active: 2020–present
- Known for: "Gay News" TikTok series

Instagram information
- Page: joshhelfgott
- Followers: 1.3M

TikTok information
- Page: joshhelfgott
- Followers: 5.9M
- Last updated: September 15, 2026

Josh Helfgott is an American LGBTQ rights activist and social media personality. He posts a TikTok series called "Gay News" covering queer history and politics affecting LGBTQ people. In 2021 he received the inaugural TikTok Queer Advocate of the Year award at the 32nd GLAAD Media Awards.

== Early life ==
Helfgott grew up with two mothers and has said that bullying at school, which began in early childhood, left him afraid to come out as gay. He has credited watching The Oprah Winfrey Show in high school with showing him that he could tell his own story publicly.

== Career ==
Helfgott began posting videos on social media in March 2020. His first video told the story of a gay couple who exchanged a secret love letter in the 1950s. He began with research-based videos on LGBTQ history and shifted toward reporting on contemporary politics affecting LGBTQ people, opening each installment with the phrase "Gay News".

In March 2021, Queerty named Helfgott the winner of Favorite TikToker at its Queerties awards. The following month, JoJo Siwa presented him with the inaugural TikTok Queer Advocate of the Year award at the 32nd GLAAD Media Awards.

He told The Washington Post in October 2022 that TikTok's duet and stitch features made hostile responses more visible, which he called "a new form of bullying". In November, The Advocate reported that he had more than 5.1 million TikTok followers and was encouraging them to vote in the midterm elections. PinkNews had also nominated him for its Influencer of the Year award. Helfgott attended a Pride Month celebration hosted by President Joe Biden at the White House on June 10, 2023, where he told the Associated Press that "Pride this year is so important because we cannot be silent when faced with hate and bigotry."
