= John Milhiser =

American actor and comedian (born 1981)

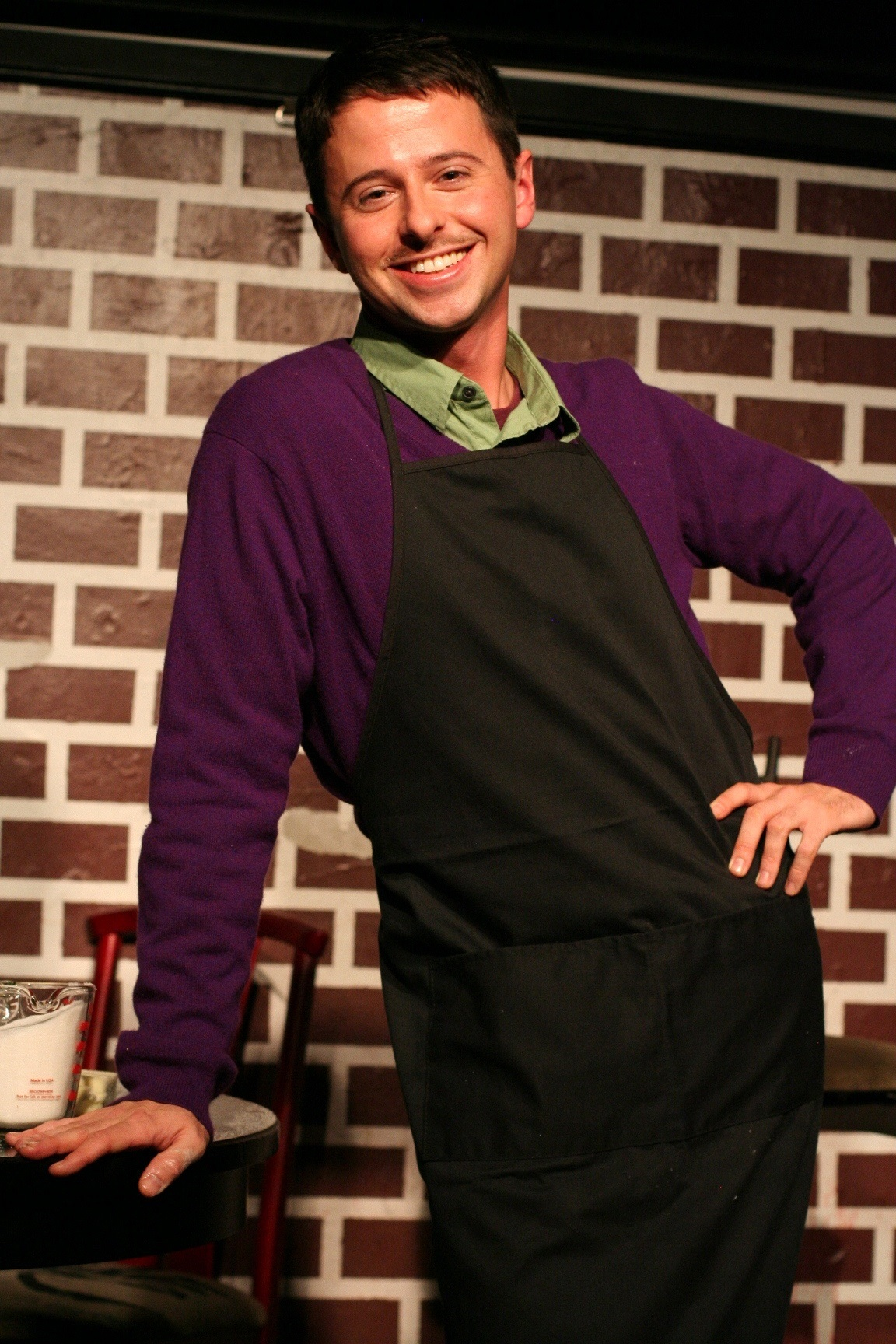
- Milhiser performing at the Peoples Improv Theater in 2011
- Born: November 29, 1981 (age 44); Belle Mead, New Jersey, U.S.
- Occupations: Actor, comedian
- Years active: 2005–present

John Milhiser (born November 29, 1981) is an American actor and comedian. He first garnered attention for his work as a member of the Upright Citizens Brigade sketch group Serious Lunch, before achieving further notice for his brief stint as a cast member on the NBC sketch comedy series Saturday Night Live for the 2013–2014 season.

== Career ==
Milhiser was a regular performer at the Upright Citizens Brigade Theater since 2005, where he was a member of the sketch comedy group Serious Lunch, who have been featured on Late Night with Jimmy Fallon and Attack of the Show. Milhiser is a native of Belle Mead, New Jersey and he graduated in 2000 from Montgomery High School in Skillman, New Jersey. He later attended Hofstra University, where he graduated in 2004 as a Film Studies and Production major and was a member of Sigma Pi fraternity.

Milhiser made his debut on Saturday Night Live on the September 28, 2013, season premiere hosted by Tina Fey with musical guest Arcade Fire. His celebrity impressions included Jon Cryer, Matthew McConaughey, Verne Troyer (as Mini-Me from the Austin Powers movies), and Billie Joe Armstrong. On July 15, 2014, it was announced that Milhiser's contract with SNL was not renewed and he would not be returning as a cast member. When asked about getting fired from SNL, Milhiser reflected 2014 was the year he felt "the least funny."

In 2014, Milhiser appeared in a supporting role in the indie film Camp Takota starring comedians Grace Helbig, Hannah Hart and Mamrie Hart. He has also made guest appearances on television programs such as Adam Ruins Everything, 2 Broke Girls, Netflix Original Series Love, and Other Space.

== Personal life ==
Milhiser was Saturday Night Live's second openly gay male cast member (after Terry Sweeney), as well as one of the few LGBTQ cast members overall.

== Filmography ==
=== Film ===
Year	Title	Role	Notes
2013	The Little Tin Man	Tourist Son	
2014	Camp Takota	Jared Meister	
2016	Ghostbusters	Higgins Student	
2019	Greener Grass	Photographer	
2021	Keeping Company	Laidback Newlywed	

=== Television ===
Year	Title	Role	Notes
2007–2015	UCB Comedy Originals	Various	46 episodes
2012	Rejected Pitches	Tim Burton	Episode: "Edward Scissorhands"
2013	Single Siblings	Cute gay guy	Episode: "More Than Facebook Friends?"
2013	Little Horribles	Various	2 episodes
2013	Joe & Dave	Les	Episode: "High School Robbery"
2013	Adam DeVine's House Party	Beer Funnel Guy	Episode: "Lady Troopers"
2013–2014	Saturday Night Live	Various	21 episodes
2013–2014	Above Average Presents	Joffrey	3 episodes
2015	Other Space	Coffee Bot	Episode: "Trouble's Brewing"
2015	2 Broke Girls	Randy	Episode: "And the Escape Room"
2015–2018	CollegeHumor Originals	Various	12 episodes
2015–2019	Adam Ruins Everything	Various	5 episodes
2016	The UCB Show	Various	Episode: "Cock Rings Are No Joke"
2016	Love	Tour Guide	Episode: "The Table Read"
2016	Comedy Bang! Bang!	AULIS	Episode: "Kevin Bacon Wears a Blue Button Down Shirt and Brown Boots"
2016	Bad Internet	Stanley	Episode: "Secrets of the Mom Web"
2016	Broken	Bohemian Pastor	Episode: "The Pastor"
2016	Typical Rick	Todd	Episode: "Headshot"
2016	Jackask	Pong inventor	Episode: "Jack to the Future"
2016–2018	Foursome	Mr. Shaw	22 episodes
2017	The Guest Book	Woody	9 episodes
2017–2019	Betch	Various	8 episodes
2018	Ghost Story Club	Benjamin	2 episodes
2019	Dark/Web	Final Zombie / Employee	Episode: "Chapter Three"
2019	Binged	Jeremy	Episode: "Pilot"
2019	Liza on Demand	Zach	Episode: "The Art of Settling"
2019	Artista Obscura	Bibi Bebe	Television film
2021	Drama Club	Mr. Clyde Sniffet	Recurring role
2023	Dirty Laundry	Himself	"Whose Family Van Got Stolen and Blown Up?"
2025	Electric Bloom	Billy Dexter (Host)	"How We Made a Tiny Mistake"
