= The Grace Helbig Show =

- Genre: Talk show
- Created by: Grace Helbig
- Directed by: Blake Webster
- Presented by: Grace Helbig
- Composer: DJ Flula
- Country of origin: United States
- Original language: English
- No. of seasons: 1
- No. of episodes: 8 (list of episodes)

Production
- Executive producers: Michael Davies; Amanda McPhillips; Grace Helbig; Ken Treusch
- Producer: Joselyn Hughes
- Editors: Matt Silfen; Tony Conte III; Barnaby Levy
- Running time: 22 minutes
- Production company: Embassy Row

Original release
- Network: E!
- Release: April 3 – June 7, 2015

The Grace Helbig Show is an American late-night talk show created and hosted by YouTube star Grace Helbig which aired on E! cable network. It premiered on April 3, 2015, and the first season ended on June 7, 2015.

== History ==
On August 6, 2014, Deadline Hollywood reported that Grace Helbig was to star in a comedy/talk show pilot, tentatively called The Grace Helbig Project. The announcement came only a few weeks before the conclusion of another E! late-night talk show, Chelsea Lately, which Helbig had previously appeared on.

On March 10, 2015, E! stated in a press release that the show, now titled The Grace Helbig Show, would premiere on April 3, 2015, at 10:30 pm ET, following The Soup.

On May 11, 2015, the network announced that the show would be moving from Fridays at 10:30 pm ET to Sundays at 11 pm ET, beginning May 31, 2015.

== Episodes ==
No.	Guests	Original release date	Viewers
1	Aisha Tyler, Mamrie Hart, DJ Flula	April 3, 2015	227,000
Grace interviews Aisha Tyler, shares videos with Mamrie Hart, and writes a song with DJ Flula Borg.
2	Nick Kroll, Tyler Oakley	April 10, 2015	236,000
Grace chats with Nick Kroll about his new film Adult Beginners, Tyler Oakley teaches Grace & Nick some internet slang, and Grace & Tyler play a game called "Hot Mess, God Bless".
3	Jim Parsons, Miranda Sings, John Green	April 17, 2015	262,000
John Green attempts to teach Grace about politics while Grace attempts to drive John to the airport; Miranda Sings, Jim Parsons, & Grace play a game called "Whelp!"; Jim answers fans' questions; and Jim & Grace play tiny tennis. Miranda Sings does a bikini dance based upon a suggestion from viewer OcularNervosa
4	Paul Scheer, Abby Lee, Mamrie Hart	April 24, 2015	182,000
Grace & Mamrie prepare for Abby Lee's appearance by making up dances based on names submitted on Twitter, then dance for Abby Lee herself. Grace, Mamrie, and Paul play a game called "We're Old" where they identify in which decade (the 80s, 90s, '00s, or '10s) certain pop culture items were popular.
5	Hilary Duff, GloZell Green, Shane Dawson, A.J. Barrera	May 1, 2015	211,000
6	Lance Bass, James Corden, Hannah Hart, Naha Armády	May 8, 2015	163,000
7	Jack Black, Adam DeVine, Erin Foster, Sara Foster	May 31, 2015	289,000
8	Dwayne "The Rock" Johnson, Mamrie Hart, Hannah Hart, Superfruit	June 7, 2015	243,000

== International broadcast ==
The Grace Helbig Show airs in simulcast in Canada on E!, the Canadian equivalent of the US channel. The show premiered on E! in Australia and New Zealand on Sunday, April 5, 2015, and on April 20, 2015, in the United Kingdom.
