= My Drunk Kitchen =

- Genre: Comedy
- Created by: Hannah Hart
- Starring: Hannah Hart
- Country of origin: United States
- Original language: English
- No. of seasons: 3
- No. of episodes: 44

Production
- Camera setup: Single-camera

Original release
- Network: YouTube
- Release: March 16, 2011

My Drunk Kitchen is a cooking show and comedy series of short videos created and posted on YouTube by content creator Hannah Hart beginning in March 2011. The series features Hart, a San Franciscan proofreader living in Los Angeles, typically attempting to cook or bake various dishes, or otherwise engaging in some food-related activity, all while imbibing large quantities of alcoholic beverages. Most episodes have their own recipe, and occasionally a corresponding beverage. The series has been praised for its drunk humor, quotable catchphrases, and use of jump cut editing. Hart's YouTube channel has 2.4 million subscribers.

== Episodes ==
=== Season 1 ===
#	Title	Recipe	Original posting date	Link
1	"Butter Yo Shit"	Grilled cheese	March 14, 2011	
Hannah attempts to cook a grilled cheese sandwich while drinking a bottle of wine she found in her sister's kitchen.
2	"Let's Mac Out"	Macaroni and cheese	March 21, 2011	
While vacationing in London, Hannah cooks up some boxed macaroni and cheese and drinks some white wine and beer.
3	"Omelette You Finish"	Omelette	April 3, 2011	
Hannah throws together something she claims is an omelette.
4	"Not Easy, Bake Oven"	Cookies	April 10, 2011	
Hannah tries her hand at baking and discovers she's not very good at it.
5	"Smashed Brothers"	Meatballs	April 17, 2011	
Hannah dresses up like Mario, attempts to cook meatballs, and consumes excessive amounts of Pabst Blue Ribbon while thwarting E. coli
6	"Brunch?"	Pancakes	April 24, 2011	
Hannah cooks up some pancakes for brunch, and shows how to make perfect a mimosa.
7	"Tacos"	Tacos	May 1, 2011	
Hannah curbs her drunk craving for Mexican food while drinking jargaritas (margaritas in a mason jar).
8	"Ice Cream? Someday..."	Ice cream	May 8, 2011	
Hannah attempts to make homemade ice cream while downing a bottle of rosé.
9	"Latkes!"	Latkes	May 15, 2011	
Hannah goes Russian with vodka and potatoes, and forgets to hit record in the process.
10	"Poutine"	Poutine	May 22, 2011	
Hannah goes native in Toronto, drinking Caesars and making poutine.
11	"Candy Hand"	(None)	May 29, 2011	
A costumed Hannah eats from a bowl of Halloween candy, which serves as the topic of her discussion. This is the first episode in the series without cooking.
12	"Pizza"	Pizza	May 29, 2011	
Hannah hardly succeeds in making a pizza using store-bought crust.

=== Season 2 ===
This season marked the beginning of the series being shot in HD.

#	Title	Recipe	Original posting date	Link
13	"Meat Pie"	Meat pie	October 7, 2011	
Inspired by Top Chef and her low opinions of pie, Hannah makes a meat pie with a turkey filling.
14	"Raw Vegan Cheesecake"	Vegan cheesecake	October 14, 2011	
Hannah invites vegan friend and fellow YouTuber HiImRawn to her kitchen to drink whisky and make cheesecake.
15	"MREs"	MREs	October 21, 2011	
Hannah hangs out in her backyard drinking beers while preparing and eating MREs.
16	"Quesadillas (PART 1)"	Quesadillas	October 28, 2011	
Hannah makes a cheese quesadilla using a low-carb tortilla while at first taking tequila shots, and then sake.
17	"Quesadillas (PART 2)"	Quesadillas	November 4, 2011	
Hannah continues to make quesadillas using blue corn and brown rice tortillas.
18	"Macaroni Salad"	Macaroni salad	November 11, 2011	
Hannah, with the help of guest star Grace Helbig, makes some macaroni salad.
19	"My Drunk Chicken"	Beer Can Chicken	March 31, 2012	
Hannah attempts to make beer can ("butt") chicken.
20	"PHO'ked"	Pho	April 8, 2012	
Hannah makes the classic Vietnamese dish, completely ignoring the instructions and resorting to eating string cheese.
9	"'O' Onion Rings"	Onion rings	April 15, 2012	
Hannah sets out to make onion rings and ends up deep-frying a single piece of onion, a cookie and some lasagna.
21	"Shepherd's Curry"	Shepherd's Curry	April 22, 2012	
Attempting to honor as many cultures as possible, Hannah decides to create Shepherd's Pie and Curry in one dish. This episode was shot in the UK.
22	"Toast"	Toast	May 2, 2012	
Hannah decides to make a variety of different toast entrees while drinking a bottle of Champagne.

While the second season continued featuring her drunk antics, Hannah accompanied "My Drunk Kitchen" with a series of videos titled "Coming Out".

#	Title	Original posting date	Link
1	"So. This is Me."	November 23, 2012	
Hannah discusses the difficulty that comes with discovering one's homosexuality.
2	"Nervous"	December 4, 2012	
She discusses what it's like to be attracted to straight friends of the same gender.
3	"Straight People"	February 5, 2013	
On the cusp of Valentine's Day, Hannah discusses one of her early relationships.
4	"MARRIAGE!"	June 26, 2013	
Hannah asks her viewers what they think about marriage, and explains her views.
5	"The Closet"	July 10, 2013	
She lists reasons why being "in the closet" is such a difficult position to be in, and how to overcome them.

Towards the end of the second season, Hannah used Indiegogo to raise $25,000 within a month in order to kick-start her roadshow, "Hello, Harto!". She successfully raised $36,000 in four hours and made plans to continue filming My Drunk Kitchen on the road. While the roadshow featured Hannah's comedy skits, the show was also used to attract viewers to help volunteer in local food operations.

After Hannah announced her roadshow, videos were no longer formally organized into seasons.

=== 2013 ===
#	Title	Recipe	Original posting date	Link
1	"Cake In A Jar!"	Cake	January 10, 2013	
In the first episode of 2013 Hannah creates a dish that can be sent by mail.
2	"Tuna Melt"	Tuna Melt	February 22, 2013	
Hannah concedes to the characteristically sloppy and uncomfortable nature of her show and makes a tuna melt with tiny pickles.
3, 4	"F.M.L / Thick Mint"	Thin Mint variation	March 4, 2013	
After forgetting to turn her microphone on and subsequently releasing a video about it, Hannah attempts to create an enlarged version of the classic Girl Scout cookie.
5	"MELTING POT!"	Random things in a pot	March 7, 2013	
Hannah celebrates her upcoming travel show, "Hello, Harto!", by combining food and drink regional to the show's planned destinations into a large pot.
6	"SHAMROCK SHAKE!"	Homemade Shamrock Shakes with Irish whiskey	March 14, 2013	
Hannah and Mamrie Hart make an alcoholic shamrock shake a Grace Helbig's house.
7	"Fish Fingers & Custard"	Fish Fingers	March 28, 2013	
In a Doctor Who themed episode, Hannah makes fish fingers with custard with comedian Chris Hardwick.
8	"Flan Girl (ft. Tyler Oakley!)"	Flan	April 25, 2013	
Hannah and Tyler Oakley make flan with adventurous fillings.
9	"SF Bread Bowl"	Bread bowl	May 2, 2013	
At one of her first stops on the "Hello Harto!" tour, Hannah makes a bread bowl.
10	"Rough NY Cheesecake!"	New York-style Cheesecake	July 25, 2013	
An exhausted Hannah tries to put together a cheesecake.
11	"D.C. CHERRY PIE"	Cherry pie	August 1, 2013	
Hannah collaborates with motivational speaker, Josh Sundquist, to create a cherry pie.
12	"Atlanta Chicken ‘n’ Waffles!"	Chicken and waffles	August 9, 2013	
Hannah films in a bar kitchen in Atlanta, Georgia, and is joined by members of the bar staff to create the perfect Atlanta-style Chicken and waffles.
13	"CHILI"	Chili con carne	August 22, 2013	
Hannah teaches herself and her audience how to make (and eat) chili.
14	"New Orleans Gumbo!"	Gumbo	August 29, 2013	
Hannah gets creative with her gumbo recipe and ingredients.
15	"BISON BURGERS!"	Buffalo burger	September 5, 2013	
Hannah grills bison/buffalo burgers in Colorado.
16	"MAPLE APPLE PIE!"	Apple pie with Maple syrup	September 12, 2013	
Hannah takes a Canadian staple, maple syrup, to give her twist on the traditional apple pie.
17	"My Drunk Kitchen: An American Tale"	September 26, 2013		
This episode is a complication of everything before it- all the drinking, cooking, and joking.
18	"TOAD IN A HOLE"	Toad in the Hole	October 3, 2013	
Hannah is joined by YouTube MUA Louise Pentland to create English classic, the Toad in a Hole.
19	"My Drunk Kitchen ft. Flula: Spätzle!"	Spätzle	October 10, 2013	
Hannah is joined by German singer and actor, Flula, to create the German dish Spätzle and consume German beers.
20	"Pumpkin Fritters!"	Fritter	October 24, 2013	
Hannah decides to make Pumpkin Fritters largely because it sounds like a vague reference to “Ta-tas”.
21	"THANKSGIVING PIE!"	Pumpkin pie for Thanksgiving	November 28, 2013	
Hannah makes a festive pumpkin pie for Thanksgiving.
22	"Christmas Cupcakes!"	Cupcakes for Christmas	December 5, 2013	
Hannah continues her exploration of seasonal foods, and finishes her series for the year, with well-decorated Christmas cupcakes!

=== Specials ===
#	Title	Recipe	Original posting date	Link
Special	"Fourth of July"	Apple pie	July 4, 2011	
In a patriotic attempt at redemption, Hannah tries her hand at baking again with an apple pie recipe.
Special	"Food52!"	Cocktails	August 18, 2011	
In a special episode with Food52, Hannah makes a watermelon and gin based cocktail.
Special	"Burning Man"	Saag Paneer	November 3, 2011	
While spending the week at Burning Man, Hannah cooks boxed Indian food while drinking mojitos.
Special	"Elaborate Thanksgiving Special 2011!!!"	(None)	November 24, 2011	
Short video of a cat grooming a Boston Terrier, an attempt of Hannah's to release a family-friend video for the holiday.
Special	"Holiday: Gingerbread?"	Gingerbread House	December 21, 2011	
Hannah tries to make a gingerbread house and ends up making a gingerbread rabbi.
Special	"Holiday: Chocolate Shuffle"	Chocolate Soufflé	February 17, 2012	
In a special for Valentine's Day, Hannah recognizes what it's like to be alone on the holiday, at first trying to make a chocolate soufflé, but then deciding to make chocolate-dipped orange slices instead.
Special	"Grilled Cheese REDUX"	Grilled Cheese Sandwich	March 15, 2012	
Hannah gets together with fellow YouTuber, Shane Dawson, recognizing Saint Patrick's Day and the show's upcoming anniversary while drinking Rum and Coke.
Special	"American Strudel (Parts 1 and 2)"	Strudel	June 28, 2012	
Despite using the wrong kind of apple, refusing to roll out the pastry and forgetting half the ingredients, Hannah makes a surprisingly delicious baked strudel.
Special	"Silent Movie!"	Breakfast cereal	September 6, 2012	
Hannah sets herself in the first silent episode impersonating one of the characters in the my drunk kitchen world, "Frederick"
Special	"Birthday cake"	Birthday cake	September 13, 2012	
With guest stars Jenna Marbles and Grace Helbig, Hannah bakes a birthday cake for Jenna.
Special	"Nachos!"	Nachos	September 27, 2012	
Hannah shows us her version of nachos.
Special	"Storm of S'mores!"	S'mores	October 29, 2012	
During Hurricane Sandy, Hannah improvises a good way to spend your hurricane supplies by making s'mores.
Special	"Caramel Apples!"	Caramel Apples	October 31, 2012	
Hannah, along with Felicia Day, prepare some classic Halloween caramel apples.
Special	"My Hungover Kitchen"	Egg in the basket	November 8, 2012	
Hannah shares some tips about how to survive a hangover while filming hungover.
Special	"Thanksgiving for Juan"	Cornish game hen, stuffing, and mashed potatoes	November 21, 2012	
Hannah shows how to prepare a Thanksgiving meal if dining alone for the holiday.
Special	"Baked Corn Dogs"	Corn dog muffins	November 29, 2012	
Hannah and Hank Green, along with Grace Helbig and Mamrie Hart, cook homemade corn dogs that are made as muffins due to a lack of sticks. The episode was shot by Grace and did not use a mounted camera due to the height differences between Hannah and the others.
Special	"Superbowl [sic] Special"	Pigs in a blanket	January 31, 2013	
Inspired by the intrinsically homoerotic nature of professional football, Hannah bakes various renditions of pigs in a blanket.
Special	"My Hungover Kitchen: Breakfast Burrito"	Breakfast burrito	January 24, 2013	
Hannah is hungover again and gives a small tour of her kitchen.

== Awards and nominations ==
Year	Category	Award	Result	Ref
2013	Best Female Performance: Comedy (for Hannah Hart)	3rd Streamy Awards	Won	
2014	Best Comedy Channel, Show, or Series	4th Streamy Awards	Won	

== Spin-offs ==
In addition to My Drunk Kitchen, Hart has also posted a series of videos, "Advice from the Hart", answering viewer questions or requests for advice.
