= Camp Takota =

- Official poster
- Directed by: Chris Riedell; Nick Riedell
- Screenplay by: Mamrie Hart; Lydia Genner
- Story by: Mamrie Hart; Michael Goldfine
- Produced by: Michael Goldfine
- Starring: Grace Helbig; Mamrie Hart; Hannah Hart
- Cinematography: Nick Riedell
- Edited by: Victor Du Bois
- Production company: RockStream Studios
- Distributed by: VHX
- Release date: February 14, 2014
- Country: United States
- Language: English

Camp Takota is a 2014 comedy-drama film starring YouTube personalities Grace Helbig, Hannah Hart and Mamrie Hart. The film is directed by Nick Riedell and Chris Riedell, also known as The Brothers Riedell, and produced by Michael Goldfine. The film, produced by RockStream Studios, was released on February 14, 2014.

== Plot ==
Elise Miller (Grace Helbig) is a twenty-something publishing assistant who is engaged to Jeff Sanford (Chester See), and just finished her first book, which is said to include "unrequited love and the Loch Ness Monster." At work, Elise accidentally sees her boss, Celia Burrows (Rachel Quaintance), making out with Walker Paige (Sawyer Hartman), of the hit "Midnight Moonlight" series. Her friend Manda (Megan M. Duffy) takes some photos of the two, which Elise accidentally uploads to the book's Facebook page; this blunder costs Elise her job. She returns home, only to find out that Jeff has been cheating on her, so she returns to her old apartment. She gets drunk, and calls Sally Meister (Ellen Karsten), the head camp counselor of Elise's old camp, Camp Takota, whom she met earlier again after eight years, and tells her that she's going back to camp. The next morning, Elise wakes up realizes what she has done, and decides to head to camp anyway. Arriving with the Fefferman family, including their young daughter Penny, Elise finds that her old friends and former Takota campers, Maxine Reynolds (Mamrie Hart) and Allison Henry (Hannah Hart), now work at the camp.

As the newest camp counselor, Elise has her hands full handling the campers, as she isn't interested in the whole camp experience. When she snaps on the campers in her class, after they find the letters Jeff has been sending her to win her back, Maxine invites her to her home with Allison later that night. Elise reveals what's been going on, with work, her ex-fiancée, and wishes that she was more like "a happier version of herself". As the three party, Elise spots Allison's acceptance letter from the Chicago Chef's Institute, then is startled by the appearance of Eli (Chris Riedell), the two girls' friend who works as a farmer. Giving her a lift back to camp, she finds that Eli had an ex-wife who cheated on him, and an attraction builds. The camp is visited by Jared Meister (John Milhiser), Sally's son, and his assistant Kyle (Jason McNichols), who want to turn Camp Takota into a more digital camp, because Takota has been losing business. Maxine soon gets confirmation from Sally that the camp will be closing after this summer, unless at least 50% of the campers pre-register for next year. She tells the news to Allison, Elise, and Chet (Cameron Britton), the camp's handyman, and they all agree to try to save the camp. However, Elise gets a call from Celia, who offers her her job back because the photos that were uploaded gave the "Midnight Moonlight" sales a huge boost, and agrees to publish her book if she arrives tomorrow morning. Elise takes up the offer, telling Maxine and Allison the news, which gets them into a heated argument because Maxine knows this isn't what Elise wants. Elise ends up revealing that Maxine is only saving the camp so she can get her promotion, and Allison got a career offer, and doesn't want Maxine to know because she is a control freak. Elise asks Eli for a ride to the train station, but he refuses because she's not just leaving Takota, she's also leaving him, so she asks Chet for a ride. Allison talks to Maxine, revealing that she wanted to leave but was afraid of her reaction, but Maxine confesses that all she wants is for Allison to go and be happy. Elise sits at the bus station, and thinks about the camp and her friends, and soon returns.

At the camp's final day, which is also Visitor's Day for parents; Elise, Maxine, and Allison put on a dance number. Later that night, Jared reveals the plan to replace Camp Takota, to which Maxine gives a tearful explanation over why they shouldn't allow that to happen. She then introduces Eli to the campers, who is also revealed to be a writer just like Elise, and tells a ghost story to them. Suddenly, Jeff interrupts and demands Elise to come home with him, but she refuses, with Jeff fighting Eli when she reveals he is her boyfriend. Jeff leaves in shame, and the night's events lead to 60% of the campers to pre-register for the next summer the next day, thus saving the camp. With the mission a success, the three girls sit and look out in the sunset before leaving. One year later, Maxine is the new head camp counselor at Takota; Allison is now in a culinary school training to be a chef in Chicago, and Elise and Eli are together, with Elise finally achieving success with her new book, "Cabin Fever", all about Camp Takota, featuring a character resembling Penny.

== Cast ==
- Grace Helbig as Elise Miller
- Mamrie Hart as Maxine Reynolds
- Hannah Hart as Allison Henry
- Chris Riedell as Eli Morton
- Chester See as Jeff Sanford
- Sawyer Hartman as Walker Paige
- John Milhiser as Jared Meister
- Jason McNichols as Kyle
- Rachel Quaintance as Celia Burrows
- Megan M. Duffy as Manda
- Olivia Alexander as Vanessa
- Kate Goldman as Penny Fefferman
- Ellen Karsten as Sally Meister
- Cameron Britton as Chet
- Amy Lindsay as Kathy Fefferman

== Production ==
The announcement of the film was made during a stage performance at YouTube's Vidcon event, with YouTube stars, Grace Helbig, Mamrie Hart, and Hannah Hart also announcing their involvement by starring in the film. Later casting revealed that notable YouTube personalities Chester See and Sawyer Hartman would also make cameo appearances in the film. At the same Vidcon event, a Camp Takota booth was opened where hundreds of fans flocked for photos and to sign up for the ongoing updates on the film's website.

Production started in rural California in August 2013, and filming ran over the course of 18 days. Camp Takota was co-financed and originally intended to be distributed by Chill.com, where the initial marketing and fan community lived until October 2013, where the website's dramatic downsizing resulted in the film being dropped from Chill.com's distribution. The film was then acquired by VHX, a digital distribution platform that helps independent artists sell video content and connect directly with their fans.

== Release and reception ==
In Fall 2013, the CampTakota.com website launched a pre-order campaign with a release date of "early 2014". On December 24, 2013, the official trailer was made available online. On January 14, 2014; Helbig and Hannah Hart both revealed on their YouTube channels that the release would be February 14. On February 5, a new extended trailer was unveiled. The film was released on February 14, 2014, on its website and later on iTunes, with optional behind the scenes extras.

The film's reviews were mixed. Some said the movie was entertaining, sweet, funny, and filled with adult oriented humour, despite the film sounding like it was for pre-teens at first glance; while other reviews felt the movie lacked surprises and was predictable in its resolutions, as well as having problems with its transitions concerning its story and character.
