= Electra Woman and Dyna Girl (web series) =

2016 film by Chris Marrs Piliero

- Official poster for the web series
- Directed by: Chris Marrs Piliero
- Starring: Grace Helbig; Hannah Hart
- Country of origin: United States
- Original language: English

Production
- Producers: Marty Krofft; Ken Treusch
- Running time: 81 minutes
- Production companies: Legendary Digital Studios; Fullscreen; Sid & Marty Krofft Pictures; Dolby

Original release
- Release: April 26, 2016

Electra Woman and Dyna Girl (stylized as Electra Woman & Dyna Girl) is a 2016 American superhero comedy web series that is a reboot of the 1976 television series of the same name. The series stars YouTube personalities Grace Helbig and Hannah Hart as Electra Woman and Dyna Girl, respectively. The series was released by Fullscreen through its own streaming platform in eight 11-minute web episodes, on April 26, 2016, and was released on all major platforms on June 7 by Legendary Digital Studios and Sony Pictures Home Entertainment. The series centers around the superhero duo as they fight crime in their local Akron, Ohio, before relocating to Los Angeles.

== Plot ==
Electra Woman (Helbig) and Dyna Girl (Hart) are two amateur superheroes who fight crime in their local city of Akron, Ohio. Wanting to be noticed for their actions, they accept an offer to relocate to Los Angeles. Consequentially they find themselves overwhelmed in the crowded superhero business, and additionally suffer from fighting amongst themselves, as Dyna Girl is displeased with being viewed as Electra Woman's sidekick.

Electra Woman and Dyna Girl are powerless superheroes in Akron, Ohio. They get discovered by CMM (Creative Masked Management) after a video of them taking down two robbers in a convenience store goes viral. They drive to Los Angeles and take the deal, working with their agent, Dan, to enhance their image and power. They meet Frank, the engineer that created their suits and gear. They fight bank robbers outside of a news studio, gaining more publicity. They deal with Major Vaunt, a superhero with a huge ego. Vaunt is eventually killed by the Empress of Evil, the first supervillain to appear since the Shadow War. After a fight between Electra Woman and Dyna Girl, the Empress of Evil kidnaps Dyna Girl and Electra Woman has to save her. They find out that the Empress of Evil is their annoying neighbor, Bernice, from back in Ohio. With the help of Frank, Electra Woman and Dyna Girl escapes the kidnapping and prepare to fight the Empress of Evil. Frank reveals the secret project he has been working on, the Electra Car. Electra Woman and Dyna Girl face the Empress of Evil for a real fight in the streets of Los Angeles. The two defeat the Empress of Evil with a peanut from a fruit stand, remembering that Bernice has a peanut allergy that causes her to explode.

== Production ==
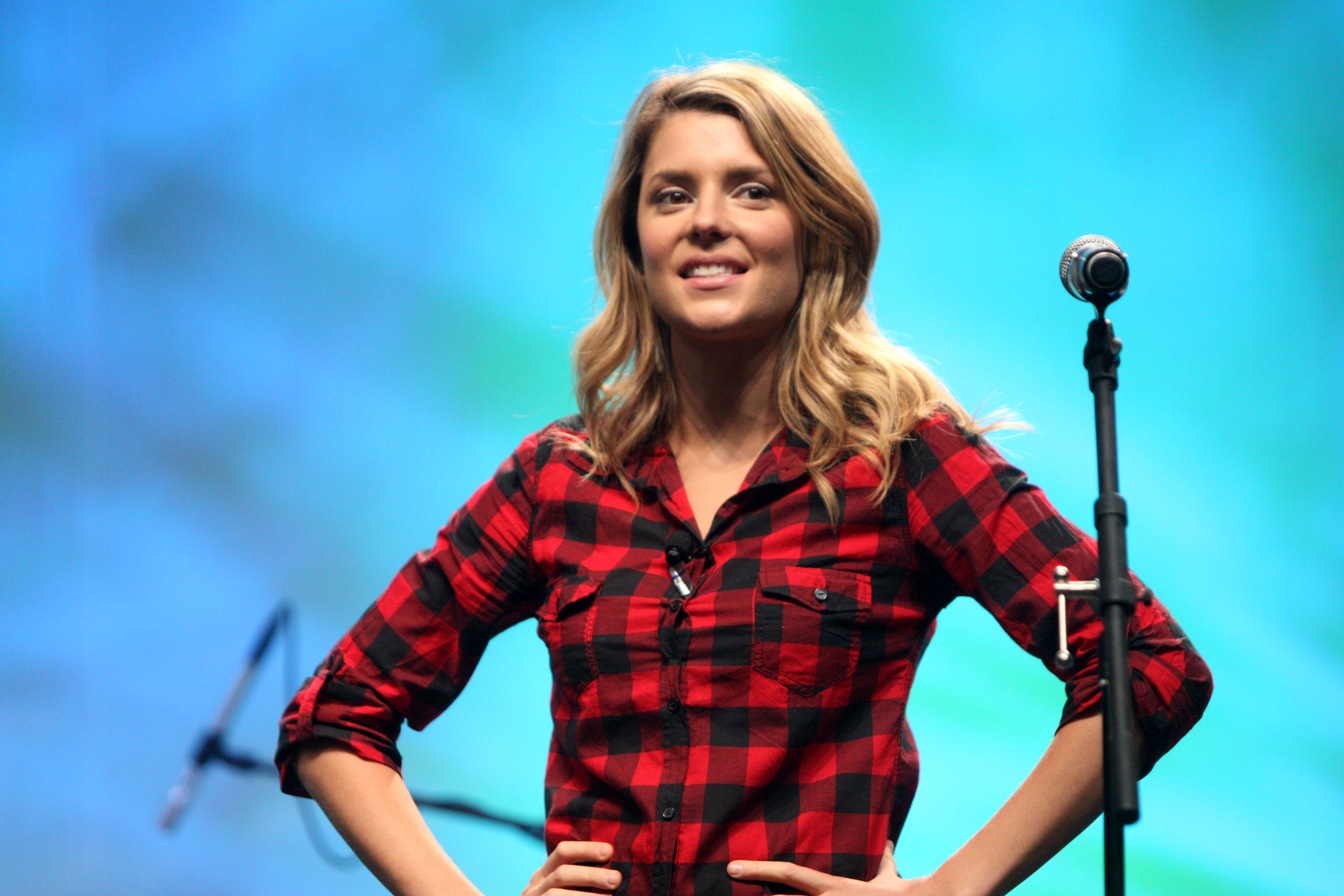
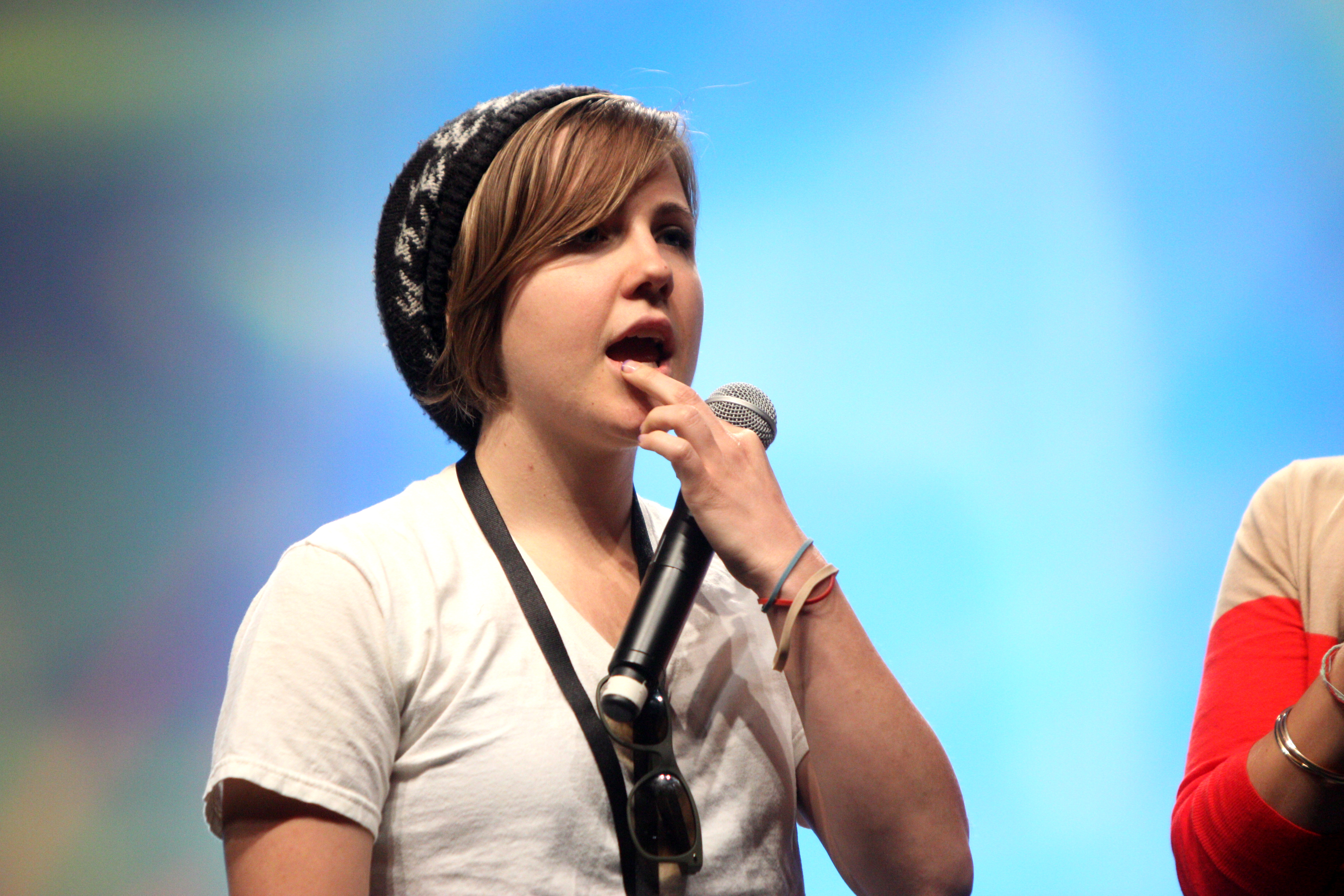
Grace Helbig (top) portrays Electra Woman and Hannah Hart (bottom) portrays Dyna Girl

Helbig detailed that the series was shot for a month and a half in Vancouver. During the production, Helbig detailed in an Entertainment Weekly interview that, "When we create these characters, we want them to feel authentic", adding "I know as an audience member myself, watching YouTube videos and wanting to consume other forms of content, I resonate with the personalities I think are the most transparent".

Hannah Hart expressed that she and Helbig "were pretty involved with the director and the costume department while the suits were being crafted", adding that the two "wanted to make sure that they weren't over-sexualized and functional for crime fighting".

== Announcement and release ==
In February 2015, Legendary Entertainment and Fullscreen announced the project, originally not clarifying whether it would be released through a digital or television platform. In July, a teaser trailer was screened at VidCon 2015, followed by a full trailer in March 2016.

It was released as a series of eight 11-minute webisodes by Fullscreen on April 26, 2016, through its digital streaming platform. It was released worldwide on June 7 on all major platforms; Sony Pictures Home Entertainment and Legendary oversaw its distribution. As of August 2018, it is available for streaming on Tubi.

== Reception ==
Judith Dry of Indiewire gave the series a B+ grade, declaring it "not as addictive as Jessica Jones, and not as funny as Spy, but it's a refreshing addition to the rapidly growing female-led superhero genre". Dry complimented the on-screen chemistry of the titular leads, as well as how the series easily passes the Bechdel–Wallace test.

Tim Poon of Platform Nation gave the series a final score of 5 out of 10, criticizing how "nothing is ever explained through action or environment or inference", noting that the extensive use of exposition via dialogue frequently contravenes the storytelling principle of show, don't tell; he believes this technique reveals "a lack of confidence from the writers in either the actors, the audience, or themselves". Poon qualified his somewhat negative opinion by adding: "Hart ... not only comes the closest to landing the majority of her character's jokes but is also a fully capable actor".

Matt Fowler at IGN, in the style of an advertorial, gave no qualitative opinion of Fullscreen's pre-film serialization other than that Helbig's Electra Woman "overshares" and "gets a bit gross".
