= Mamrie Hart =

American comedian, actress, writer, and performer

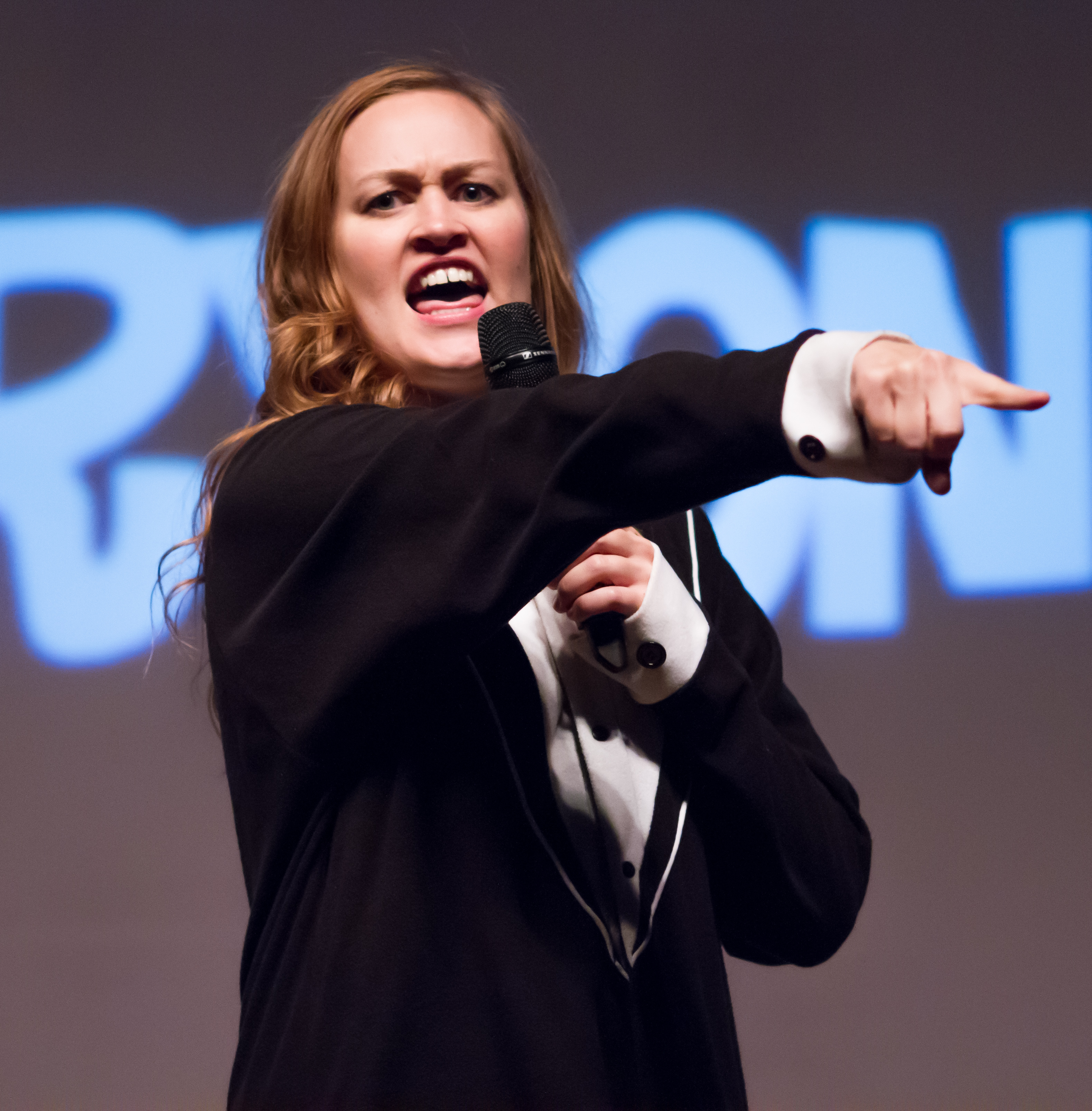
- Hart at the #NoFilter show in Portland, Oregon, in December 2013
- Born: Mamrie Lillian Hart; September 22, 1983 (age 43); Dover, New Jersey, U.S.
- Education: University of North Carolina, Chapel Hill (BA)
- Occupations: Internet personality; comedian; actress; author

YouTube information
- Channel: YouDeserveADrink
- Years active: 2009–present
- Genre: Comedy
- Subscribers: 1.03 million
- Views: 86 million
- Last updated: June 14, 2025

Mamrie Lillian Hart (born September 22, 1983) is an American comedian, actress, writer, and performer. She gained popularity in 2011 through her YouTube show You Deserve a Drink, for which she has won two Streamy Awards: in 2014 for Actress in a Comedy and in 2015 for Writing. Hart previously hosted Food Network's Tiny Food Fight on Discovery+ alongside Darnell Ferguson. As of October 2021, she has over 1 million YouTube subscribers and her main channel has over 97 million views. She also co-wrote, co-produced, and co-starred in the 2014 film Camp Takota and the 2016 film Dirty 30.

== Personal life ==
Hart was born in New Jersey and went to high school in Boonville, North Carolina. Her father is actor David Hart and her mother, Caroline Mayhall, is a high school English teacher. She has a brother named David and a sister named Annie. Her parents divorced when she was nine years old. Hart's first name is a tribute to her great-grandmother, Lillian Mamrie. Hart earned her Bachelor of Arts in drama and communications from UNC-Chapel Hill. Upon graduation, she moved to New York City to pursue "serious acting," where she worked as a bartender as a source of income.

== Career ==
=== Cudzoo and the Faggettes ===
Hart joined forces with Erin 'E-Bomb' McCarson and Jessica 'J-Train' Bartley and formed a band called Cudzoo & the Faggettes. The band is known for its humorous, innuendo-laden lyrical content and live shows. They came up with Cudzoo in reference to the kudzu vines that are prevalent in the South where all three women came from. They refer to their own style as a mixture between dirty doo wop and vintage rock. They often perform in New York, although the band is currently on a hiatus because Hart now resides in Los Angeles. They have released two albums, The Prettiest Girls With The Filthiest Mouths (2009) and Daddy Issues (2012). The most notable singles are "Daddy Issues" and "New York Girls".

=== Upright Citizens Brigade ===
Hart wrote and performed sketches with the Upright Citizens Brigade at the Chelsea location in New York City, both live and in online shorts. One recurring collaboration with Stephen Soroka under the title BOF (short for best of friends, pronounced "boaf") was nominated for Best Sketch Group at the 2010 and 2011 ECNY Awards. She also wrote and starred with fellow alums Gabe Liedman and Jim Santangeli on the Cooking Channel's online sketch comedy show, Fodder.

=== YouTube ===
Hart joined YouTube on June 20, 2009. She began her main channel, You Deserve A Drink, on March 13, 2011, where she primarily posts weekly instructional mixology videos, with a unique cocktail presented in each. This combines her past work experience as a bartender with performing. The videos contain pop culture references, sexual innuendo, and numerous puns, and occasionally she makes drinks for celebrities who she feels deserve a drink. Once the drink is finished, Hart encourages viewers to make the cocktail themselves and then rewatch the video, using it as a drinking game wherein the participant takes a drink each time she makes a pun. Her favorite drink is a gin gimlet, straight up.

Hart periodically collaborates with other YouTube personalities, such as Grace Helbig, Tyler Oakley, Hannah Hart (no relation), and Flula Borg. She has also performed in videos on other YouTube channels like Rainn Wilson's Soul Pancake, Sing-A-Gram on My Damn Channel, and Multi-break Up with The Fine Brothers.

On May 7, 2013, Hart introduced her second YouTube channel, Mametown, on her Tumblr page. Prior to this, the account did not contain any videos despite being created in 2009. Hart uploads videos here that are unrelated to You Deserve a Drink. She initially requested viewers to recommend what she should post on the channel. Since then she has uploaded many unique videos that range from performing as wacky characters to introducing her dog, Beanz, to vlogging. Hart was also involved in YouTube's Comedy Week program which began on May 19, 2013.

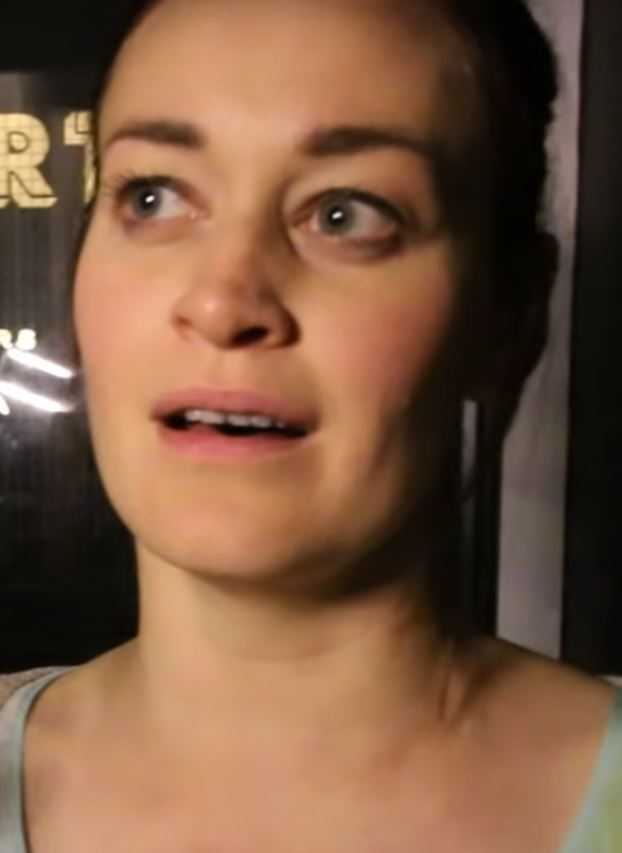
Hart appearing in a Vlogbrothers video in 2016

On July 1, 2014, Hart and Grace Helbig premiered footage of their travel web show #HeyUSA on the YouTube channel Astronauts Wanted. On October 15, 2014, eight full-length episodes were posted to Conde Nast Entertainment's digital platform The Scene. A second season of #HeyUSA was released April 16, 2015, this time with special guest hosts instead of Grace Helbig. Viewers selected the following cohosts: Colleen Ballinger, Flula Borg, Kingsley, Jenna Marbles, and Tyler Oakley. Helbig selected the location to which Hart and her co-host traveled for each episode.

On May 18, 2016, Hart guest starred in Season 5 of the YouTube series Epic Rap Battles of History, playing the role of Julia Child and rapping opposite EpicLLOYD playing the role of Gordon Ramsay. In 2016, she also moderated a panel that included Jake Paul and Alfie Deyes on the legacy of social media for Web Summit in Lisbon, Portugal.

Starting in March 2018, Hart and Grace Helbig began hosting a new YouTube show together called This Might Get... on a dedicated channel of the same name. The show was named after their long-running live stand-up show, This Might Get Weird, Y'all. Each episode focused on a different topic, meme, or pop culture event. It was executive produced by Michael Goldfine, who worked with the on-screen duo on Camp Takota and Dirty 30. The show ran for 151 episodes before being cancelled in October 2018.

=== #NoFilter live show ===
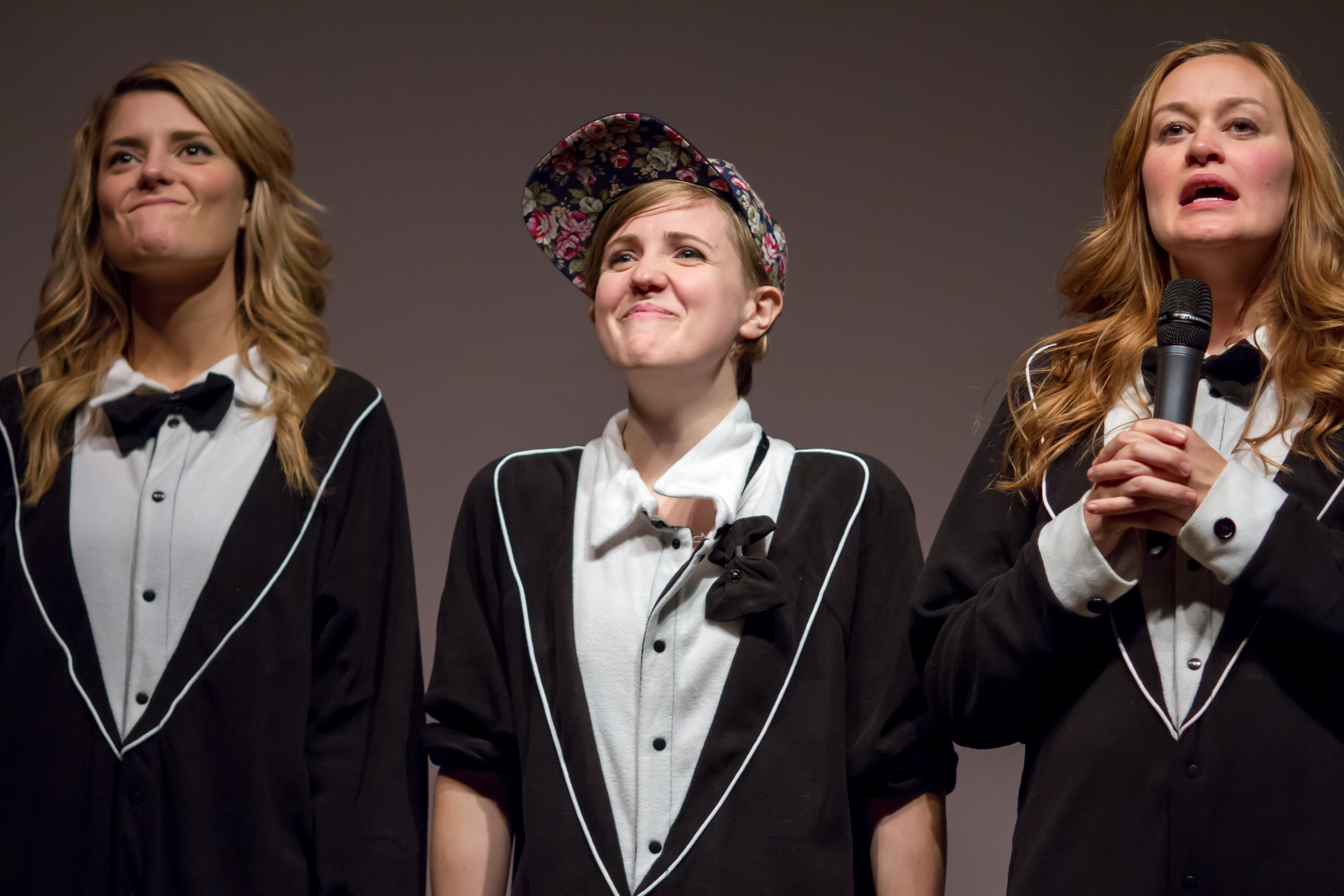
Grace Helbig and Hannah Hart (no relation) onstage with Mamrie at No Filter in Portland, Oregon, in December 2013

In 2012, Grace Helbig, Hannah Hart, and Mamrie Hart put together a live variety show which they named #NoFilter with comedy sketches, improv, giveaways, and songs. In contrast with many live performances, they encourage documentation of the show by the audience. They have also re-enacted fan fiction written by Tumblr users which includes all three women. She also appeared in a similar series of sketches called FANtasies that adapted a soap opera style. The premiere was called "Paging Dr. Hart".

=== Television ===
While at UNC, Hart played a bisexual girl named Erin on General College, a student-run soap opera. She later co-hosted the web series Luxor Race Through the Pyramid at the Luxor Las Vegas, which aired on MySpace in 2013.

She appeared in an episode of Don't Trust the B— in Apartment 23 in the show's second season in 2014 in the episode "Ocupado," as Theresa.

Hart had a guest appearance in the 13th episode, "Taboo", of The Trixie & Katya Show in 2017.

Hart had thirteen appearances on Comedy Central quiz show @midnight throughout all four seasons from 2014 through 2017. She was the winner in five of her appearances (episodes 80, 171, 355, 415, and 493). Hart also appeared in the pilot episode of The Grace Helbig Show on E! on April 3, 2015. She had a recurring role in Oscar's Hotel for Fantastical Creatures in 2015, where she portrayed a pink gigantic octopus named Octochef who is the titular hotel's residential chef.

Hart has also appeared in several television commercials, including a campaign for La-Z-Boy featuring Brooke Shields.

=== Film ===
On August 2, 2013, Hart announced on the main stage at VidCon 2013 that she would be starring in her first feature film alongside friends Grace Helbig and Hannah Hart. Hart co-wrote the script with Lydia Genner. Camp Takota stars Helbig as a young woman who is forced to leave her big city job and head back to her old summer camp where she is reunited with old friends played by Hannah and Mamrie. The film, directed by Chris and Nick Riedell, began shooting in California on August 12, 2013. The film's official trailer was released on December 24, 2013, on Hart's, Helbig's and Hannah's respective main YouTube channels, as well as on the film's official website. On February 5, 2014, an extended trailer was released on Helbig's it'sGrace channel and on the Camp Takota website. Camp Takota was released via digital download on February 14, 2014.

On October 28, 2015, Hart and her Camp Takota co-stars Grace Helbig and Hannah Hart announced pre-production on a new feature film titled Dirty 30. The film was released on September 23, 2016, in select theatres and on digital HD. Mamrie Hart won a Streamy Award in 2017 for her performance in Dirty 30 for Acting In a Comedy.

=== Books ===
==== You Deserve a Drink ====
Hart landed a book deal with Plume Books in early January 2014. The book, titled You Deserve a Drink: Boozy Misadventures and Tales of Debauchery was released on May 26, 2015.

About her book, Hart said:

Each chapter will have its own recipe, so in an ideal world, when you are reading about that time I fell in love with the half-snake, half-man guy and ran off with him to work in the carnival for a summer, you will make the cotton candy martini to drink while you read. Side note: That isn't actually one of my stories. The half-snake, half-man guy was way too good for me.

As to the style, she stated:

My whole brand of humor is self-deprecation — about owning your flaws and saying 'Fuck you' to anyone who doesn't like it. Hopefully that feeling will come across in [this book]. To where if you have a really embarrassing story, embrace it... Every story that I'll tell will lead up to why I am why I am.

==== I've Got This Round: More Tales of Debauchery ====
Hart's second book, I've Got This Round: More Tales of Debauchery, was released on February 6, 2018. She launched a U.S. tour for the release in February, 2018.

Hart's newest book, All I Think About Is Food, is released on April 29, 2025.

=== Podcast ===
Hart and Grace Helbig started a podcast, This Might Get Weird, succeeding their YouTube talk show This Might Get... in October 2018. The pair have also begun broadcasting their podcast in video format on the original show's YouTube channel. The podcast consists of them discussing random stories from their daily life and pop culture.
