= I Hart Food =

American reality television series

- Genre: Food reality television; Travel documentary
- Starring: Hannah Hart
- Country of origin: United States
- Original language: English
- No. of seasons: 1
- No. of episodes: 6

Production
- Producer: Warrior Poets
- Running time: 22:00

Original release
- Network: Food Network
- Release: August 14 – September 18, 2017

I Hart Food is an American food travelogue television series that aired on Food Network. It was presented by YouTube personality Hannah Hart, who also served as executive producer. The series featured Hart traveling to eateries in different cities and learning how to cook foods of different ethnic cuisines.

I Hart Food officially premiered on August 14, 2017, and concluded on September 18, 2017.

== Episodes ==
No.	Title	Original air date	Production code	City
1	"Santa Fe Fiesta" (Note: "Santa Fe Fiesta" was produced as the fifth episode, but it aired as the pilot episode.)	August 14, 2017	TBA	Santa Fe, New Mexico
2	"Southern Fried Asheville" (Note: "Southern Fried Asheville" was produced as the pilot episode, but it aired as the second episode.)	August 21, 2017	TBA	Asheville, North Carolina
3	"Portland is for Lobsters" (Note: "Portland is for Lobsters" was produced as the fourth episode, but it aired as the third episode.)	August 28, 2017	TBA	Portland, Maine
4	"Oregonna Eat That?" (Note: "Oregonna Eat That?" was produced as the second episode, but it aired as the fourth episode.)	September 4, 2017	TBA	Eugene, Oregon
5	"Tater Tot-Polis, Minnesota" (Note: "Tater Tot-Polis, Minnesota" was produced as the third episode, but it aired as the fifth episode.)	September 11, 2017	TBA	Minneapolis, Minnesota
6	"Meat Me in Montana"	September 18, 2017	TBA	Missoula, Montana
