= Dirty 30 =

- Official poster
- Directed by: Andrew Bush
- Screenplay by: Mamrie Hart; Molly Prather
- Story by: Mamrie Hart; Grace Helbig
- Produced by: Michael Goldfine
- Starring: Mamrie Hart; Grace Helbig; Hannah Hart
- Cinematography: Tom Banks
- Edited by: Brett W. Bachman
- Music by: Ross Flournoy
- Production company: Lionsgate
- Distributed by: IMG Films
- Release date: September 23, 2016
- Running time: 86 minutes
- Country: United States
- Language: English

Dirty 30 is a 2016 comedy film starring YouTube personalities Mamrie Hart, Grace Helbig, and Hannah Hart. The film is directed by Andrew Bush, and produced by Michael Goldfine. The film was released on September 23, 2016.

== Plot ==
Kate Fields (Mamrie Hart) is a dentist assistant whose job is a bit middling, while her love life has resulted in either meeting people like Richard (Adam Lustick) on blind dates, or just staying at home alone most nights. Evie Jones (Grace Helbig) is married to Todd Jones (Andy Ridings), and both live with his parents (Betsy Randle, John Hayden), who do not respect her and recruit her into an endless succession of charitable causes that only suit their own interests. Charlie (Hannah Hart) is in a relationship with the girl of her dreams, Claire (Kelen Coleman), whom she wants to marry; but just can't seem to pull her business or her act together, despite her promise to Claire to do so. When the three arrive at Kate's apartment for Taco Tuesday, they reveal that their old high school letters to their future selves was mailed to them. Kate reads her about having a great job, being married, and having a child, none of which has come true for her, making her feel depressed. As her 30th birthday approaches, Charlie and Evie decide to throw Kate a party, inviting all of their old friends from high school, and using the home of Evie's husband's parents as Todd and his parents will be gone. As Evie and Charlie set up everything, Evie is afraid that Oliver (Murphy), a teen who knows the elder Jones, might squeal so she tells him he can come with his friends, which means bringing his crush, Kinsey (Hughes), and his brother, Richard. Kate's boss Jules (Sertich) is also coming over, with patient Dan (Dellapina) whom she is trying to hook up with Kate. Unwanted guests arrive however, in the form of the "bitch", Ashley (Akana).

Kate arrives, and the party is in full swing, with a huge crowd taking over the house. Kate feels uncomfortable as she wanted a smaller party, but Evie and Charlie win her over, and things start out great. Old friends reunite, Kate talks with Dan and they hit it off, while avoiding Richard who has arrived in his goth alter-ego "Raven", and everyone is having a good time. However, Oliver sees that Kinsey had arrived with her date Derrick (Leyva), leaving him a loner at the party despite occasionally bonding with her; and Charlie is having betting competitions with Peter (Chamberlain), which is against what she promised to Claire. Evie meets with ex-boyfriend Ben (See), and through a misunderstanding, Kate sees Dan leaving with Ashley. Charlie loses to Peter, proving Claire's point, and she leaves; Jules and Richard/Raven hit it off, while an out of it Kate calls her ex-boyfriend Luke (Cole) about why they didn't continue their relationship, to which he reminds her it was because she didn't want it to continue. Evie and Ben hang out only for her to discover that Ben is creep who still longs for her, and has tattooed her face on his body. Evie freaks out, and after an incident with the teenagers, orders them to leave. Kate, Evie and Charlie discover a broken champagne bottle left by Ashley, and decide to get even with her after so many years.

The three arrive at Ashley's home and throw toilet paper all over the yard, as they proclaim the best day and birthday ever, but Evie slips out that she hates her husband and wants a divorce. Dan arrives with Ashley and the homeless man (Ahlquist) she was making out with at her home, where Ashley is furious by their actions, but slips and damages her tooth. Realizing it needs to be taken out otherwise the jaw will be affected, Kate puts the tooth out, and is overjoyed until police arrive and arrest the three, spending the night in jail. Oliver takes Kinsey home, and she realizes Derrick isn't the right guy for her, giving him hope. The three girls are freed thanks to Todd, whom Dan called for help, and Evie puts down her overbearing husband and announces she wants to divorce him. Charlie reunites with Claire, and reveals to her the bet was for her to lose, make Peter look cool, so he can help their business. Kate meets with Dan, and after clearing up what happened, go to breakfast together. It ends with the announcement of Charlie and Claire's engagement, and Kate's high school letter to herself now reflecting her relationship with Dan, loving her job, and the "child" in the form of Evie living with her. In the post credits scene: Ashley wakes up to see her missing a tooth and screams in horror.

== Cast ==
- Mamrie Hart as Kate Fields
- Grace Helbig as Evie Jones
- Hannah Hart as Charlie
- Adam Lustick as Richard/Raven
- Joselyn Hughes as Waitress
- Anna Akana as Ashley Driscoll
- Annie Sertich as Jules
- Timothy Ryan Cole as Luke
- Betsy Randle as Todd's Mom
- Andy Ridings as Todd Jones
- John Hayden as Todd's Dad
- Matt Dellapina as Dan
- Mikey Murphy as Oliver
- Drew Monson as Rufus
- Lloyd Ahlquist as Homeless Man
- Flula Borg as DJ DJ
- Caitlin O'Connor as Party Goer
- Kelen Coleman as Claire
- Dan Chamberlain as Peter Finch
- Lee Newton as Rebecca
- Rhett McLaughlin as Dude #1
- Link Neal as Dude #2
- Katherine Hughes as Kinsey
- Josh Leyva as Derrick
- Bobby Bitton as Ski Dude
- Chester See as Ben
- Nathan Barnatt as Marcus
- Timothy DeLaGhetto as Cop

== Production ==
The film was shot in Santa Clarita and Los Angeles, both in California.

== Release and reception ==
The film was released on 23 September 2016 in select theatres in the United States, and on Digital HD. It was later released on DVD in Target on the 27th of September.

The film was met with mixed reviews. S. Johanna Robledo of Common Sense Media gave the film three stars out of five, saying "it does mostly work, largely thank to great chemistry between its three female leads."

Mamrie Hart's performance won the film a Streamy Award for "Acting in a Comedy" at the 7th Streamy Awards in 2017, with the film also securing nominations in the "Ensemble" and "Feature" categories.
