= Flula Borg =

German actor, comedian, and musician (born 1982)

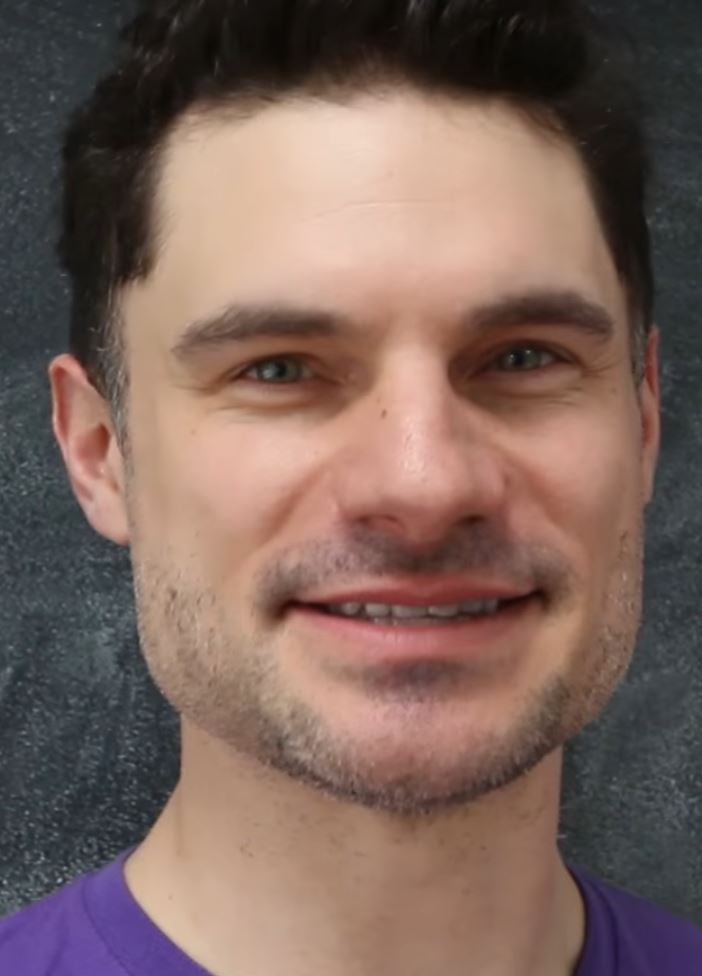
- Borg in 2016

Background information
- Also known as: Flula; DJ Flula
- Born: 28 March 1982 (age 44); Erlangen, Bavaria, West Germany
- Genres: EDM; hip hop
- Occupations: Actor; screenwriter; comedian; YouTuber; DJ; rapper; singer; songwriter; record producer
- Instruments: Vocals; beatboxing; trombone; trumpet; baritone horn; keyboards; accordion; melodica; glockenspiel; stylophone
- Years active: 2007–present
- Website: www.flulaborg.com

YouTube information
- Channel: Flula
- Years active: 2007–present
- Genres: Comedy; music; vlogs
- Subscribers: 1.09 million
- Views: 126 million
- Last updated: 3 October 2026

Flula Borg (German: [flʊla bɔɐ̯k] 28 March 1982) is a German actor, comedian, YouTuber, and musician. Borg's acting career includes roles in feature films, including Pitch Perfect 2 and The Suicide Squad, as well as in a number of television shows, including Curb Your Enthusiasm, The Good Place, Pitch Perfect: Bumper in Berlin, and The Rookie. He has made multiple appearances on Conan and has participated in a number of other collaborations with Conan O'Brien.

Across a wide variety of projects, he has worked with YouTube personalities such as Rhett and Link, Miranda Sings, and Smosh, as well as mainstream celebrities including Sir Mix-A-Lot, Ed Helms, and Dirk Nowitzki. In 2015, he was named one of The Hollywood Reporter's Top 25 Digital Stars as well as one of Variety's 10 Comics to Watch. He lives in Los Angeles.

== Film and television ==
In 2015, Borg co-starred in Pitch Perfect 2 as a leader of the German a cappella group Das Sound Machine (also known as DSM). This led to appearances on talk shows such as Last Call with Carson Daly, as well as the first of many appearances on the Comedy Central game show @midnight. Buddymoon, a feature film written and produced by Borg, David Giuntoli, and filmmaker Alex Simmons, and starring Borg and Giuntoli, was shown at several major film festivals in early 2016. It won the Audience Award for Best Narrative Feature at the Slamdance Film Festival and was acquired by Gravitas Ventures and Orion Pictures for theatrical release. Later in 2016, Lionsgate Films announced a development deal with Borg under which he will serve as star, executive producer, and writer of two upcoming feature films. Beginning in 2017, he has done a great deal of voice acting, appearing in roles such as Hans the Horse in Blue Sky Studios' Ferdinand and the personal assistant Maybe in Disney's Oscar-nominated feature Ralph Breaks the Internet. He also voices a part in Trolls World Tour, produced by DreamWorks Animation and released in 2020.

In addition to his film work, Borg has acted in a number of TV series, including Curb Your Enthusiasm, Workaholics, Silicon Valley, Counterpart, The Good Place and Ghosts. In 2015, he co-hosted E!'s Live from the Red Carpet pre-show at the Billboard Music Awards. He has been a guest on the TBS talk show Conan several times, including an episode in which he served as Conan O'Brien's informal guide to Germany when the show traveled to Berlin for a week. In 2017, Borg's own social action special Flulanthropy premiered on the streaming channel Seeso. He has also done voice acting in several series, including Archer, The Mr. Peabody & Sherman Show, and Rapunzel's Tangled Adventure. Borg voices a leading role as Mega Fat CEO Baby in the DreamWorks Animation/Netflix series The Boss Baby: Back in Business. In 2022 Borg guest starred on the TV series The Rookie as Skip-Tracer Randy.

=== Digital media ===
Borg has posted over 350 videos on his YouTube channel since its launch in 2007. Some of his most popular videos are his vlogs, most notably "Jennifer is a Party Pooper", "Flula in Germany", and his AutoTunes series, in which he records cover songs live in a car. His AutoTunes video with YouTube celebrity Chester See, a cover of "No Diggity" by Blackstreet, has over four million views and was nominated for a Streamy Award in 2014. He is also known for his celebrity interviews, and for creating EDM tracks from sound clips gathered during many of those interviews. Celebrities interviewed on Borg's YouTube channel include Will Ferrell and the cast of Anchorman 2, Vince Vaughn, Tina Fey, Anna Kendrick and the cast of Pitch Perfect 2, Larry King, and Michael Phelps.

In addition to his own channel, Borg has appeared on many other popular YouTube channels, including Miranda Sings, Grace Helbig, Smosh, vlogbrothers, jacksfilms, and Madilyn Bailey. His comedic video with Flynt Flossy of Turquoise Jeep Records, "Taste You Like Yogurt" has over 2 million views. In 2014, Borg's YouTube channel was listed on New Media Rockstars' Top 100 Channels and he won the 2015 Streamy Award for Comedy in recognition of his humorous contributions on YouTube.

In 2018, Borg launched his podcast, BoomTime, which is produced by Cadence 13. It is directed by his frequent collaborator Alex Simmons. Notable guests have included Ed Helms, Kristen Schaal, Reggie Watts, Hanson, and "Weird Al" Yankovic. The podcast came to an end in 2021. In September 2023, Borg launched his second podcast, Flula Makes Five, an audio comedy series.

== Music ==
From his beginnings as a Schuhplattler dancer in Bavaria, Germany and through many years of live performance and YouTube content, Borg has always been involved in music. After winning the Scion Hypeman Contest in late 2008 as its only non-American participant, he began releasing more of his own music. His 2011 single "Sweet Potato Casserole" was listed at No. 3 on Billboard's Next Big Sound chart. In the same year, his single "Dirk Nowitzki, German Moses" coincided with the Dallas Mavericks' NBA championship run and was picked up by ESPN and other mainstream outlets. In 2014, he composed the theme song for Grace Helbig's podcast, Not Too Deep, and the following year he was chosen to create the theme song for The Grace Helbig Show on E! Entertainment Television.

Also in 2015, Borg released a five-track EP titled I Want to Touch You. Videos for all of the tracks were posted to his YouTube channel. In early 2016, he released a full-length album called Animalbum, so named because all of the songs on the album are related to animals, both real and mythological. It was produced by comedian and producer of The Bachelor, Elan Gale. In 2019, Borg released a single titled 'Self Care Sunday', featuring the American comedic music group Ninja Sex Party, to Spotify.

=== Live performances ===
Borg regularly performs live music and comedy. From 2009 to 2012 he was the host and MC for College Battle of the Bands and he hosted the Chegg Textbooks & Tickets Tour in 2011. From 2013 through 2015, he hosted Bedrocktoberfest, a music festival held in Los Angeles to coincide with Oktoberfest. As a result of his success on YouTube, he has been featured four times—in 2013, 2016, 2017, and 2018—on the main stage at VidCon. He is active on the comedy festival circuit, appearing at Just for Laughs festivals in Montreal, Toronto, and Vancouver; at SF Sketchfest in San Francisco; and at the Blue Whale Comedy Festival in Oklahoma. He has also done solo shows in a number of cities, including Seattle, Portland, and Los Angeles. In late 2018 Borg served as Conan O'Brien's DJ, opening act, and sidekick on O'Brien's 18-city comedy tour, "Team Coco Presents Conan & Friends: An Evening of Stand-Up and Investment Tips."

== Selected filmography ==
Year	Title	Role	Notes
2013–14	Auction Hunters	Himself/Handyman	4 episodes
2013–19	Last Call with Carson Daly	Himself/Guest	4 episodes
2015	The Grace Helbig Show	Himself/Guest	Episode 1.1
2015	Pitch Perfect 2	Pieter Kramer	
2015	Alvin and the Chipmunks: The Road Chip	Man behind the mask	
2015–17	@midnight	Himself/Guest	12 episodes
2016	Younger	Dorff	2 episodes
2016	Buddymoon	Flula	Also co-writer and co-producer
2016	Dirty 30	DJ DJ	
2016–17	Chelsea	Himself/Guest	3 episodes
2016–20	Conan	Himself/Guest	9 episodes
2017	Workaholics	Jimmy Sparx	Episode: "Termidate"
2017	The Mr. Peabody & Sherman Show	Joe Troplong	Voice, episode: "Peabody's Delivery"
2017	Silicon Valley	Joel	Episode: "Hooli-Con"
2017	Killing Hasselhoff	Alcee	
2017	Ferdinand	Hans	Voice
2017	Flulanthropy	Himself	Also writer and producer
2017	Curb Your Enthusiasm	Ernst	Episode: "Fatwa!"
2018	The Mick	German teacher	Episode: "The Trip"
2018	Counterpart	Stas	4 episodes
2018–20	The Boss Baby: Back in Business	Mega Fat CEO Baby, additional voices	Voice, 10 episodes
2018	Archer	Ziegler	Voice, episode: "Danger Island: A Warrior in Costume"
2018	The Good Place	Helmut Deutschermann	Episode: "The Ballad of Donkey Doug"
2018	Ralph Breaks the Internet	Maybe	Voice
2018	Adam Ruins Everything	The Rewards Dude	Episode: "Adam Ruins Flying"
2018–19	Rapunzel's Tangled Adventure	Alfons	Voice, 3 episodes
2019	Lucky	Reggie	Voice, television film
2019	Pinky Malinky	Byonk	Voice, episode: "Mannequin"
2019–2023	Teen Titans Go!	Robotman	Voice, recurring role
2020	Trolls World Tour	Dickory	Voice
2020	Brews Brothers	Truffle	4 episodes
2020	Bad Therapy	Serge	
2020	Amphibia	Professor Harringbone	Voice, episode: "Sprig Gets Schooled"
2020	DuckTales	Christoph the Spice Baron	Voice, episode: "The Split Sword of Swanstantine!"
2021	Jellystone!	The Great Gazoo	Voice, episode: "Gotta Kiss Them All"
2021	Poorly Drawn Lines	Gilandrical (AKA Gil)	Voice, episode: "The Museum"
2021	Tacoma FD	Antonin Aroma	Episode: "The Quiet Party"
2021	Aquaman: King of Atlantis	Mantis	Voice, 2 episodes
2021	Centaurworld	Comfortable Doug	Voice, 10 episodes
2021	The Suicide Squad	Gunter Braun / Javelin	
2021	Mr. Mayor	Sforg	Episode: "Brentwood Trash"
2021	Wolfboy and the Everything Factory	Monsieur Snjor	Voice, episode: "Wolfboy Makes a Snowflake"
2022	Chip 'n Dale: Rescue Rangers	DJ Herzogenaurach	Voice
2022	Luck	Jeff	Voice
2022	Pitch Perfect: Bumper in Berlin	Pieter Kramer	Main role
2022–26	The Rookie	Skip Tracer Randy	7 episodes
2022	The Guardians of the Galaxy Holiday Special	Bartender	Cameo; TV special
2023	Ghosts	Soren	Episode: "Isaac's Book"
2023	Is It Cake?	Himself / Judge	Episode: "Cake Me Out to the Ballgame"
2023	Good Burger 2	Food Dude	
2024	My Spy: The Eternal City	Bishop Crane	
2024	Dinner Time Live with David Chang	Himself	Episode: "Oktoberfest"
2024	Bonhoeffer	Hans von Dohnanyi	
2025	Win or Lose	Francis	Voice; 2 episodes
2025	StuGo	General Quartz	Voice; episode: “Pea-Brained Mutant Crystal Nuptials”
2025	Super Duper Bunny League	Doc Choc	Voice; episode: "Chocolate Bunnies!"
2025	Digman!	Fritz, additional voices	Voice, episode: “Freud’s Couch”
2025	Rock Paper Scissors	Franz Roll	Voice; 2 episodes
2026	Tulsa King	Bradley Van Heusen	Season 4

=== Music videos ===
Year	Title	Artist(s)	Role	Ref.
2015	"Crazy Youngsters"	Ester Dean	Himself	
