= Tyler Oakley =

American YouTuber and activist (born 1989)

- Oakley in 2025
- Born: Mathew Tyler Oakley; March 22, 1989 (age 37); Jackson, Michigan, U.S.
- Education: Michigan State University (BA)

YouTube information
- Channel: TylerOakley
- Years active: 2007–present
- Subscribers: 6.63 million
- Views: 638 million
- Last updated: April 23, 2026

Mathew Tyler Oakley (born March 22, 1989) is an American YouTuber, actor, activist, author, television personality and Twitch streamer. Much of Oakley's activism has been dedicated to LGBTQ youth, LGBTQ rights, as well as social issues including health care, education, and the prevention of suicide among LGBTQ youth. Oakley regularly posts material on various topics, including pop culture and humor.

Since uploading his first video in 2007 while a freshman at Michigan State University, his YouTube channel has garnered over 683 million views, and, at its peak, had over 8 million subscribers. He was featured in the 2014 Frontline investigative report "Generation Like", a follow-up on how teenagers are "directly interacting with pop culture" to the 2001 report, "The Merchants of Cool".

From March to October 2013, Oakley co-hosted a weekly pop-culture news update—"Top That!"—with Becca Frucht for PopSugar. In 2015, he released his first collection of humorous personal essays under the title Binge, via publisher Simon & Schuster.

In 2017, he was named in Forbes "30 Under 30".

== Early life ==
Mathew Tyler Oakley was born on March 22, 1989, in Jackson, Michigan. He has twelve siblings. When he was an infant, his parents divorced. When he was in the sixth grade, Oakley moved to Okemos, Michigan, and became involved in choir and drama. As a teenager, he had bulimia nervosa. Oakley came out as gay in high school.

Oakley graduated with a Bachelor of Arts in communication, marketing and social media from Michigan State University. While in college, he fell into a short depression after a breakup with a long-term boyfriend. Oakley admits he considered suicide at this time. His college years were also when he first became involved with YouTube, using the video sharing website to communicate with his high school friends, who were attending different schools.

== Career ==
=== Social media ===
Oakley began making YouTube videos in 2007, as video updates for his high school friends while he was in college. After graduating, he moved to San Francisco, California and began working as a social media manager, while making videos after his shifts. He began to gain a larger following after posting videos about his obsessions – namely artists Lady Gaga and One Direction and the television series Glee. By 2012, he had reached a million followers. Oakley was also known for his frequent collaborations with fellow big name YouTubers – Troye Sivan, Connor Franta, Grace Helbig, Zoella, Hannah Hart, and more. Oakley saw great success during this time becoming one of the first monetized YouTubers and 2013, he had amassed 3.9 million subscribers. This era is often described as the "Golden Age" of YouTube, as it saw the rise of vloggers that went on tour, published books, was the founding for VidCon, and reached outside the online atmosphere.

Through his success, Oakley was able to interview and collaborate with a number of celebrities and notable figures. In 2013, he interviewed One Direction for their documentary tour film One Direction: This Is Us and took part in their promotional seven-hour-stream 1D Day.

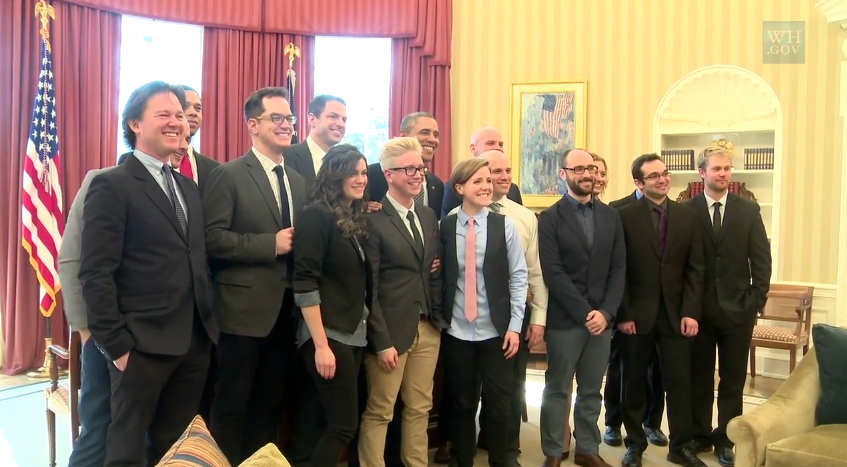
Oakley (front row, fourth from left) and fellow YouTubers with President Barack Obama in 2014

In 2014, he was given the opportunity to meet then U.S. President Barack Obama at the White House and do a video with First Lady Michelle Obama talking about education issues. The Advocate in their 2014 "40 under 40: Emerging voices" says that, due to Oakley's presence on YouTube, he is the first openly gay person that many people have met. Oakley was considered one of the world's leading celebrity influencers, having an Influencer score of 99 from the influencer marketing software Klear.

In 2015, Oakley was listed in TIME Magazine's "The 30 Most Influential People on the Internet" and The Hollywood Reporter's Top 25 Digital Stars. In December, he released his documentary film, Snervous, with Awesomeness Films. The film focused on his rise to fame and his journey on a sold-out tour.

In 2016, Oakley launched The Tyler Oakley Show, which aired weekly on Ellen DeGeneres' ellentube platform. That year, he also interviewed then-presidential candidate Hillary Clinton during campaign season.

By 2017, he had amassed almost eight million subscribers. In December 2020, Oakley announced he was taking an indefinite hiatus from making YouTube videos. He is currently actively streaming on Twitch, and sporadically uploads on YouTube.

In 2025, Oakley was inaugurated into Vidcon's Hall of Fame for his early work and contributions to digital culture.

=== Television ===
On screen, Oakley has done appearances on broadcasting platforms, with some airing on national TV. He was seen on Insider Tonight, featuring co-hosts Kevin Frazier and Thea Andrews. He has interviewed live from the 2014 Kids Choice Awards red carpet, along with many other events that have him meeting and speaking to celebrities. In 2015, he appeared on MTV's reality television show Catfish: The TV Show as a guest host, alongside Nev Schulman.

Oakley, alongside best friend Korey Kuhl, competed in the 28th season of The Amazing Race, which aired in 2016. The pair finished in third place. The two returned for the 31st season of the show, where they finished in second place.

In 2017, Oakley appeared on the YouTube Premium show Escape the Night, appearing as "The Thespian" for 10 episodes in Season 2. Oakley also made a guest appearance on the tenth episode of the tenth season of RuPaul's Drag Race, where he was paired with Monét X Change for a makeover challenge.

=== Other works ===
In 2014, Oakley premiered a live show tour, "Tyler Oakley's Slumber Party", featuring him in pajamas and doing skits, and interactive segments with the audience. His two initial shows sold out in 72 hours, and the tour eventually added 40 cities internationally. Oakley had also been a part of DigiTour's 2014 US Summer tour of YouTube and Vine personalities. That same year, Oakley launched his podcast, Psychobabble, with his best friend, Korey Kuhl.

In October 2015, he released his memoir Binge, covering his life in Michigan, relationships, fame, and his struggles with eating disorders and domestic violence. The book was a New York Times bestseller for 11 consecutive weeks.

In 2016, he released a line of eyewear in collaboration with Warby Parker.

== LGBTQ advocacy ==
Oakley is an avid supporter of The Trevor Project, an organization for the prevention of suicide among LGBTQ youth. He interned with them in 2009 and since 2011 has co-hosted TrevorLIVE, the charity's annual red carpet event. Since 2013, Oakley has raised over a $1 million for the organization.

Oakley attributes his success only in part to his accessibility as a young gay man. "It's not all about me being gay. It's kind of like an underlying theme for me [with gay life] sprinkled throughout the videos." He has stated that Ellen DeGeneres was a role model: "She embodies what I want my experience to be and my influence to be, where it's a positive one, it's a happy one, it's not something about the bad parts of life or the downsides of a lot of things. She's using her influence for good, and everyone knows who she is, what she stands for, and that she is a lesbian." Much of his online persona and videos focused on his life as a gay man. He also used his platform to advocate for other LGBTQ+ people by sharing their stories. His 2017 online documentary Chosen Family was an eight-part series that focused on the stories of LGBTQ+ refugees.

In 2012, singer Ricky Martin credited Oakley's 2008 "Coming Out Day" video as inspiration for his coming out. In 2015, Oakley was honored by GLAAD, receiving the Davidson/Valentini Award for making a significant difference in promoting equality for the LGBT community. He was also awarded by Attitude with their Young Hero Award for his advocacy in 2016.

== Bibliography ==
- Binge. 2015.

== Filmography ==
=== Television ===
Year	Title	Role	Notes
2012	Watch What Happens Live with Andy Cohen	Self - Bartender	Episode: "Tamar Braxton & Denise Richards"
2014	Becoming YouTube	Self	Episode: "Everything Changes"
2014 - 2015	The Talk	Self - Guest	5 episodes
2015	Catfish: The TV Show	Self - Guest Host	2 episodes
2015	Virtually Famous	Self - Panellist	Episode #2.2
2016	The Jim Gaffigan Show	Self	Episode: "Ugly"
2017	Escape the Night	The Thespian	12 episodes
2016	Team Kaylie	Self	Episode: "Winging It"
2016 - 2018	The Amazing Race	Self - Contestant	Seasons 28 & 31
2018	RuPaul's Drag Race	Self	Episode: "Social Media Kings Into Queens"
2021	Exposure	Self - Guest Judge	Episode: "Ready, Set, Shoot!"

=== Film ===
Year	Title	Role	Notes
2015	Luna Goes Cruising	Crouton	Short film
2015	Snervous	Self	Documentary film
2019	Pokemon: Detective Pikachu	Roundhouse Spectator	Uncredited

=== Online series ===
Year	Title	Role	Notes
2013	My Drunk Kitchen	Self	Episode: "Flan Girl"
2013	The Mythical Show	Self	Episode: "Smosh & Star Trek"
2013	1D Day	Self	
2013	Smosh	George Tyler Washington	Episode: "The End of Christmas: Part 2"
2014	YouTube Rewind: Turn Down for 2014	Self	
2014 - 2015	Smosh Babies	Baby Tyler	5 episodes
2016	On the Spot	Self	Episode: "The Amazing Jock Models"

== Awards and nominations ==
Year	Award	Category	Nominated	Result	Ref.
2012	The Queerties	YouTube Idol	Himself	Won	
2012	The Queerties	LOL Of The Year	"Tyler Oakley Chats with Straight British Twins"	Won	
2014	The Shorty Awards	YouTube Star	Himself	Nominated	
2014	The Shorty Awards	Video Blogger	Himself	Nominated	
2014	The Shorty Awards	Blogger	Himself	Nominated	
2014	The Shorty Awards	Activism	Himself	Nominated	
2014	The Shorty Awards	Petty Category	Himself	Nominated	
2014	The Shorty Awards	First Person	Himself	Nominated	
2014	The Trevor Project Awards	Trevor Youth Innovator Award	Himself	Won	
2014	OUT100	OUT100 Readers' Choice	Himself	Won	
2014	Young Hollywood Awards	Viral Superstar	Himself	Nominated	
2014	Teen Choice Awards	Choice Web Star: Male	Himself	Won	
2014	Teen Choice Awards	Choice Web Collaboration	"The Boyfriend Tag" with Troye Sivan	Won	
2014	Streamy Awards	Entertainer of the Year	Himself	Won	
2014	Streamy Awards	Activist Icon of the Year	Himself	Won	
2014	Streamy Awards	First Person	Himself	Nominated	
2014	The Queerties	Twitter Account You Should Be Following	Himself	Nominated	
2015	Podcast Awards	Best LGBTQ+ Podcast	Psychobabble with Tyler Oakley & Korey Kuhl	Won	
2015	Webby Awards	First Person	Himself	Nominated	
2015	The Shorty Awards	Podcast	Himself	Nominated	
2015	GLAAD	Davidson/Valentini Award	Himself	Won	
2015	Streamy Awards	Entertainer of the Year	Himself	Nominated	
2015	Streamy Awards	First Person Series	Himself	Nominated	
2015	Streamy Awards	Social Good Campaign	Himself	Nominated	
2015	MTV Fandom Awards	Social Superstar of the Year	Himself	Nominated	
2015	Teen Choice Awards	Choice Web Star: Male	Himself	Nominated	
2015	Teen Choice Awards	Choice YouTuber	Himself	Nominated	
2016	Webby Awards	Web Personality	Himself	Nominated	
2016	Webby Awards	Best Web Personality/Host	Himself	Won	
2016	Shorty Awards	YouTuber of the Year	Himself	Nominated	
2016	Streamy Awards	First Person	Himself	Nominated	
2016	Teen Choice Award	Choice Web Star: Male	Himself	Nominated	
2017	People's Choice Awards	Favorite YouTube Star	Himself	Nominated	
2017	Out Web Fest	Vanguard Award	Himself	Won	
2018	Streamy Awards	Streamy Legacy Award	Himself	Won	
2018	Out Web Fest	Visibility Award	Himself	Won	
2018	Out Power 50 Awards	Power of Originality Award	Himself	Won	
2018	Teen Choice Awards	Choice Male Web Star	Himself	Nominated	
2021	The Queerties	Best Podcast	Psychobabble with Tyler Oakley & Korey Kuhl	Nominated	
2022	The Queerties	Best Podcast	Psychobabble with Tyler Oakley & Korey Kuhl	Nominated	

== See also ==
- List of YouTubers
