= Grace Helbig =

American YouTuber and actress

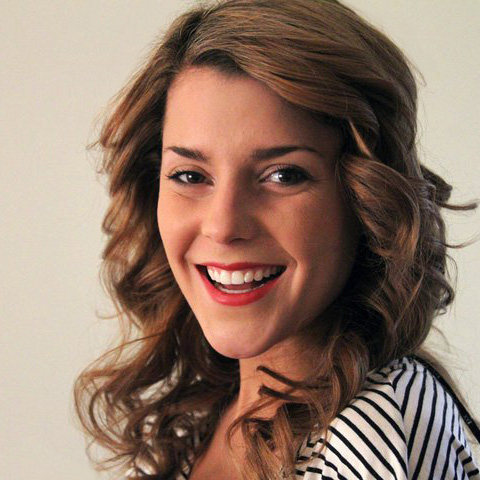
- Helbig in 2011
- Born: Grace Anne Helbig; September 27, 1985 (age 41); Woodbury, New Jersey, U.S.
- Education: Ramapo College (BA); Pacifica Graduate Institute (MA)
- Occupations: Comedian; actress; internet personality
- Years active: 2008–present
- Spouse: Elliott Morgan (m. 2022)

YouTube information
- Channel: Grace Helbig
- Years active: 2006–present
- Genre: Comedy
- Subscribers: 2.6 million
- Views: 330 million
- Last updated: November 12, 2026

Grace Anne Helbig (born September 27, 1985) is an American comedian, actress, and internet personality. She is the co-creator and co-host of the podcast This Might Get Weird (2018–present) alongside frequent collaborator Mamrie Hart.

Helbig created and hosted the My Damn Channel web series DailyGrace (2008–2013). She was a correspondent on the G4 network tech series Attack of the Show! (2011–2012), played Idol on the Fine Brothers' web series MyMusic (2012–2013), and co-produced and starred in the feature films Camp Takota (2014), Electra Woman and Dyna Girl (2016) and Dirty 30 (2016). She created and hosted the comedy/talk show on the E! television network The Grace Helbig Show (2015).

She has authored two comedic handbooks for Millennials: Grace's Guide: The Art of Pretending to Be a Grown-up (2014) and Grace & Style: The Art of Pretending You Have It (2016).

== Early life ==
Born Grace Anne Helbig in Woodbury, New Jersey, on September 27, 1985, Helbig is the daughter of Theresa Marie (née Tull) and John Helbig. She has an older brother, John Joseph, and a younger, Timothy James.

She attended Gateway Regional High School in Woodbury Heights, New Jersey. She was a successful track star and medal-winning pole-vaulter.

In 2003, Helbig began studying at Ramapo College in Mahwah, New Jersey, and graduated summa cum laude with a Bachelor of Arts in digital filmmaking from Ramapo's School of Contemporary Arts. It was there that she formed a sketch comedy group called Baked Goods with her best friend, Michelle Akin. She took improv classes at the Peoples Improv Theater in New York City. In 2005, she entered the Miss New Jersey USA pageant competition, reaching the semi-finals.

== YouTube and other web video ==
=== Content creator ===
In November 2007, Helbig house-sat for a family in South Orange, New Jersey. To alleviate boredom and keep herself entertained, she began a daily vlog of her house sitting experience on her personal YouTube channel GracieHInABox. Beginning March 2008, Helbig and her college roommate Michelle Akin (née Vargas) created the Grace n' Michelle YouTube channel. The most recent video on this channel was uploaded on October 25, 2013, when Helbig visited Akin in Brooklyn.

In early 2008, Helbig narrated the short-lived animated web series, Bedtime Stories on My Damn Channel, which consisted of R-rated parodies of classic fairy tales. My Damn Channel founder and CEO Rob Barnett discovered her personal vlogs through her profile and offered her the opportunity to host her own video blog web series on the My Damn Channel website. This became DailyGrace, which premiered on April 14, 2008, with new episodes published every weekday. On October 11, 2010, DailyGrace was launched as its own YouTube channel. By the end of December 2013, the channel had amassed over 2.4 million subscribers and over 211 million video views on YouTube. From the series' inception in April 2008 through December 2013, Helbig created over 830 DailyGrace episodes for the DailyGrace YouTube channel—in addition to the 690 DailyGrace episodes that had been published exclusively on the My Damn Channel website (i.e., all episodes up to October 8, 2010, as well as additional extra videos after that date).

From March 2012 through January 2013, Helbig hosted My Damn Channel LIVE once a week from the company's New York City studio (the remaining weekday episodes were hosted by Beth Hoyt). In November 2013, the series was revived in a weekly format as My Damn Channel LIVE: Hangout, with Helbig making a few appearances via video chat from the Los Angeles studio.

On September 13, 2013, Helbig premiered her weekly web series Grace's Faces on beauty guru Bobbi Brown's newly created YouTube channel I love makeup. The series lasted twenty-four episodes and ended March 7, 2014.

On November 4, 2013, Helbig premiered a weekly supplemental DailyGrace series exclusive to the My Damn Channel website entitled One Thing You Didn't Know About Me From Last Week. The series lasted five episodes and ended December 2, 2013.

On December 27, 2013, Helbig uploaded her final DailyGrace episode to the DailyGrace YouTube channel. Four days later, My Damn Channel released a statement announcing that Helbig had chosen not to renew her multi-year contract with the network, and that going forward, no new content would be created by Helbig for the DailyGrace YouTube channel. My Damn Channel indicated that the DailyGrace YouTube channel would remain active solely as an archive, with plans for the network to upload the early DailyGrace episodes and other Helbig content that had formerly been exclusive to the My Damn Channel website.

On January 6, 2014, Helbig relaunched her personally owned, formerly secondary channel it'sGrace (renamed from GracieHinABox) as her main YouTube channel. News of Helbig's departure from My Damn Channel and the shift back to her own independent channel contributed to a dramatic increase in it'sGrace subscribers, from just under 87,000 in the last week of 2013 to over a half million by the first week of 2014. On January 22, 2014, just two and a half weeks after the channel's relaunch, it'sGrace passed 1 million subscribers. On April 30, 2014, it was announced via press release that Helbig had partnered with multi-channel network Fullscreen. On December 30, 2014, just one week shy of the one-year anniversary of the channel's relaunch, it'sGrace passed 2 million subscribers. On August 22, 2016, it'sGrace passed 3 million subscribers, surpassing her DailyGrace channel peak. As of August 2021, Helbig's YouTube channel has 2.65 million subscribers and over 331 million video views.

On July 1, 2014, Helbig and co-host Mamrie Hart premiered preview footage of their summer travel-themed web series #HeyUSA on the Astronauts Wanted YouTube channel. Eight full-length episodes premiered on Conde Nast Entertainment's digital video platform The Scene on October 15, 2014. A second season of #HeyUSA premiered on The Scene on April 16, 2015, albeit without Helbig as Hart's travel partner. Instead, Helbig introduced each episode and announced the location she chose for Hart and guest travel companions Kingsley, Tyler Oakley, Jenna Marbles, Colleen Ballinger, and Flula Borg.

On March 31, 2016, in conjunction with AT&T Hello Lab, Helbig premiered a new series Writing With Grace on her YouTube channel, in which she instructed viewers to collaborate with her via Wattpad to co-write a novella called "Freak Week". Helbig, along with other fellow YouTube personalities, held a live reading of the completed novella at VidCon on June 24, 2016.

On November 15, 2017, it was announced via press release that Helbig had left Fullscreen and partnered with multi-channel network Studio71.

Starting on March 5, 2018, Helbig and Mamrie Hart began hosting a new YouTube show together called This Might Get... on a dedicated channel of the same name. Each episode had a different title, with the premiere being called "This Might Get Started", and focuses on a different topic, meme, or pop culture event. It is executive produced by Michael Goldfine, who worked with the on-screen duo on Camp Takota and Dirty 30. Hart and Helbig published their 100th episode of This Might Get... on July 20, 2018, entitled "Making Slime Fail!". The series announced its beginnings on October 12, 2018.

Beginning October 22, 2019, Helbig hosted Studio71's eight episode Facebook Watch web series Ladies First.

=== Actress ===
In 2009, Helbig appeared as the character of Barbie in the music video "Barbie Eat a Sandwich" by the band Care Bears on Fire.

In 2012, during the inaugural IAWTV Awards, Helbig met with the Fine Brothers. The two still needed to cast someone to play the role of Idol for their new web series MyMusic and during their meeting, they offered her the role. Helbig flew out to Los Angeles the next week to shoot the first season. Helbig subsequently appeared in the first seven episodes of the series' second season.

In July 2013, in the last three episodes of Season 2 Part 2 of the hit web series The Most Popular Girls in School, Helbig voiced Jeannie Halverstad, the abrasive show host of Cheer Nationals. In March 2014, Helbig voiced a different character, Pamela Darabond, in three Season 3 episodes.

In May and June 2014, Helbig appeared as Anna in two episodes of the second season of the musical web series Side Effects on the AwesomenessTV YouTube channel.

On November 17, 2014, Helbig and Hannah Hart appeared as Juliet and Bonnie Parker respectively in the Epic Rap Battles of History Season 4 episode Romeo and Juliet vs. Bonnie and Clyde.

On February 26, 2015, it was announced via various media outlets that Helbig would be co-starring with Hannah Hart in a reboot of the 1970s Sid and Marty Krofft live action science fiction television series Electra Woman and Dyna Girl. The reboot, directed by Chris Marrs Piliero, was shot in Vancouver during February and March 2015. The official trailer was released on March 29, 2016. The reboot was released on April 26, 2016, as an 8-episode web series on Fullscreen's subscription platform. It was released as a full-length feature film via various digital media outlets on June 7, 2016.

On August 6, 2015, Helbig was featured in a series of online commercials for Marriott Hotels & Resorts for the company's "It Pays to Book Direct" ad campaign.

On October 6, 2015, Helbig appeared in the fourth episode of PJ Liguori's web series Oscar's Hotel for Fantastical Creatures where she portrays the anthropomorphic hermit crab called Hermit. The six-episode series launched exclusively on Vimeo's on-demand service.

Beginning September 21, 2019, Helbig appeared as animal expert Annalise in the eight episode Comedy Central Facebook Watch web series Beast to Beauty.

She voiced Cindy Bear, Yappee, Taffy and Granny Sweet in the HBO Max animated series Jellystone!

== Television ==
Helbig has appeared in numerous commercials, as well as appeared as herself on various television shows and talk shows. She was first featured as Green Girl in a series of public service announcements for The N's The Big Green Help environmental awareness campaign from 2008 to 2009.

On January 5, 2015, it was announced via press release that Helbig would star in a hybrid comedy/talk show for E!, titled The Grace Helbig Show. In preparation for the show, Helbig was interviewed live via satellite on multiple local television news broadcasts across the United States on March 27, 2015. The Grace Helbig Show premiered on April 3, 2015. The series lasted eight episodes and ended June 7, 2015.

== Film ==
Helbig has appeared in several films as herself in collaborations with other YouTubers, including director Dan Dobi's 2012 YouTube documentary Please Subscribe and Corey Vidal and Shay Carl's Vlogumentary.

Her first film Camp Takota stars Helbig as a young woman who is forced to leave her big city job and head back to her old summer camp where she is reunited with old friends played by Hannah Hart and Mamrie Hart. The film, directed by Chris & Nick Riedell, began shooting in California on August 12, 2013. The film's official trailer was released on December 24, 2013, on Helbig's, Hannah's and Mamrie's respective main YouTube channels, as well as on the film's official website. On February 5, 2014, an extended trailer was released on Helbig's it'sGrace channel and on the Camp Takota website. Camp Takota was released via digital download on February 14, 2014. The film was made available on streaming media service Netflix on December 1, 2014.

Helbig appears in Alex Winter's Smosh: The Movie, starring Anthony Padilla and Ian Hecox, alongside fellow YouTubers Jenna Marbles, Markiplier, Harley Morenstein and others. The film's trailer (featuring Helbig) premiered on the Smosh YouTube channel on June 12, 2015. The film was released via various online outlets on July 24, 2015.

Helbig co-starred with Hannah Hart in a reboot of the 1970s Sid and Marty Krofft live action science fiction television series Electra Woman and Dyna Girl. The reboot, directed by Chris Marrs Piliero, was shot in Vancouver during February and March 2015. The official trailer was released on March 29, 2016. The reboot was released on April 26, 2016, as an 8-episode web series on Fullscreen's subscription platform. It was released as a full-length feature film via various digital media outlets on June 7, 2016.

Helbig and her Camp Takota co-stars Hannah Hart and Mamrie Hart appeared in a feature film titled Dirty 30. The film, directed by Andrew Bush, began shooting in California on November 9, 2015. It was released digitally and in select theaters on September 23, 2016.

On May 30, 2018, it was reported via various press outlets that Helbig had joined the cast of the upcoming film The Wedding Year.

== Podcasts ==
=== Not Too Deep with Grace Helbig ===
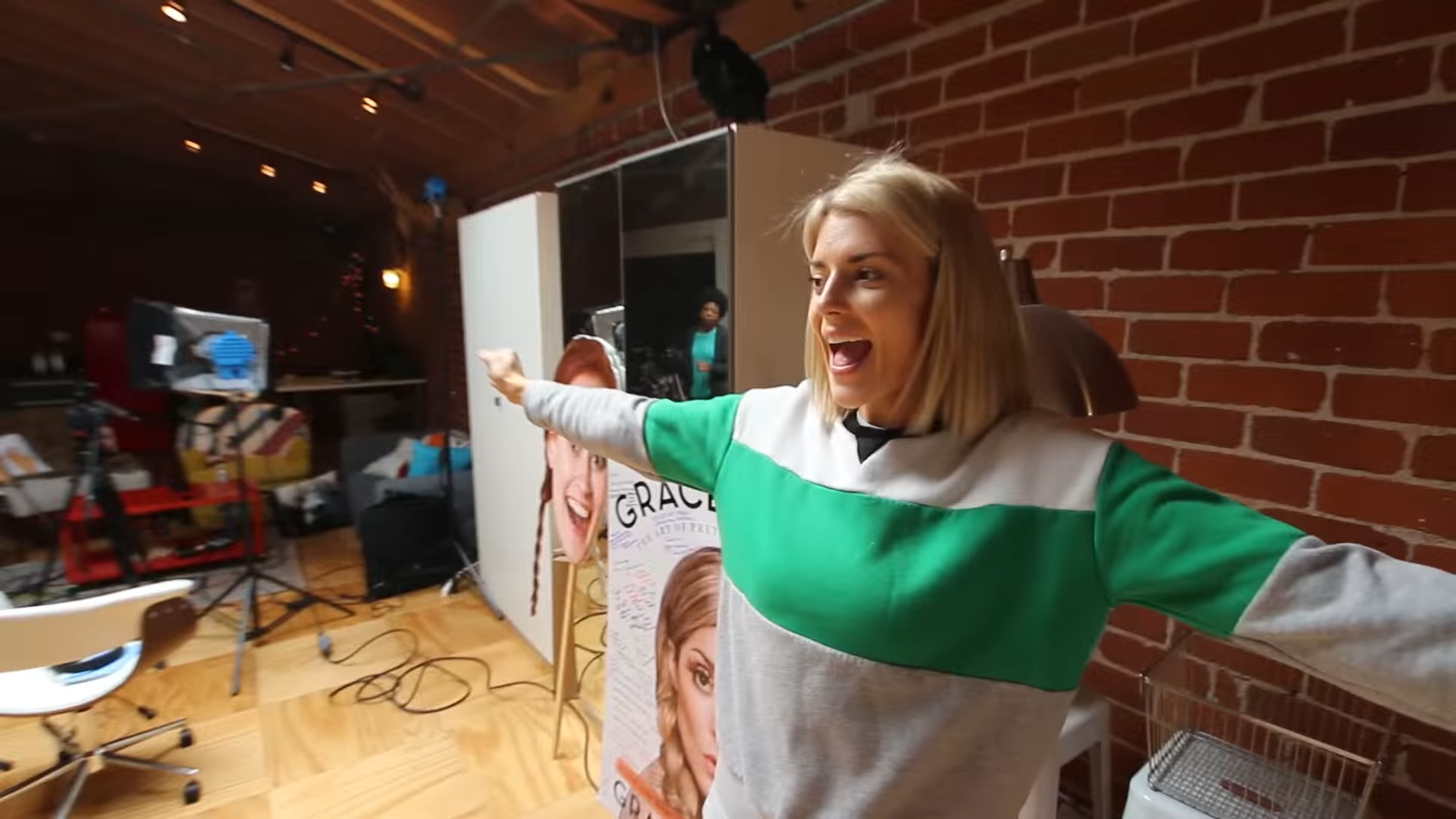
Helbig recording Not Too Deep in 2016

On September 1, 2014, Helbig premiered her audio-video podcast Not Too Deep with Grace Helbig. New full-length episodes are made available each Monday on SoundCloud and iTunes, with video footage featured on Helbig's YouTube channel. Podcast episodes are produced by Melisa D. Monts.

The podcast debuted at number one on iTunes' Top Podcasts chart.

Most "season one" episodes were recorded at the YouTube Space Los Angeles (unless otherwise noted), most "season two" episodes were recorded at Helbig's Los Angeles home (unless otherwise noted), most "season three" episodes are recorded at Helbig's Los Angeles office space (unless otherwise noted), and most "season four" episodes are recorded at Fullscreen's studios (unless otherwise noted).

Most "season one" challenges are variations of pre-existing YouTube challenges, whereas most "season two" challenges pre-exist on YouTube. Beginning "season three" and continuing with "season four", challenges have been phased out in favor of video highlights of the interviews.

Beginning September 12, 2016, Not Too Deep with Grace Helbig began broadcasting for the first time in full-length video format on Fullscreen's subscription service, with episodes being filmed at Fullscreen's studios. Audio-only of the prior week's video episode available on iTunes and SoundCloud the following week.

On November 13, 2017, it was announced across various media outlets that Fullscreen would be shutting down its subscription service. The final full-length video episode of Not Too Deep with Grace Helbig was released the same day as the announcement. The podcast continued to air new audio-only episodes every Monday via iTunes and SoundCloud.

On October 8, 2018, the podcast once again began broadcasting in both audio and video form, with full-length video being uploaded to Helbig's YouTube channel.

On March 7, 2022, the podcast went on indefinite hiatus.

=== This Might Get Weird ===
On October 12, 2018, after announcing the cancellation of their YouTube series This Might Get..., Helbig and co-host Mamrie Hart announced the premiere of their new podcast This Might Get Weird, with new episodes to be released every Wednesday on iTunes and SoundCloud.

On May 29, 2019, the podcast joined Rooster Teeth's podcast network The Roost. On February 11, 2021, Rooster Teeth announced that Helbig and Hart would host a supplemental 10-episode podcast under the This Might Get Weird umbrella beginning March 5, 2021, entitled How Ya Been?, in which the two interview other veteran YouTube personalities.

=== Pile It On ===
On March 29, 2020, Helbig premiered this audio-video podcast alongside co-host Elliott Morgan, in which they review reality television. New audio episodes are released every week on iTunes and SoundCloud, with full video on Morgan's YouTube channel. The most recent episode was released on September 6, 2020.

== Live performances ==
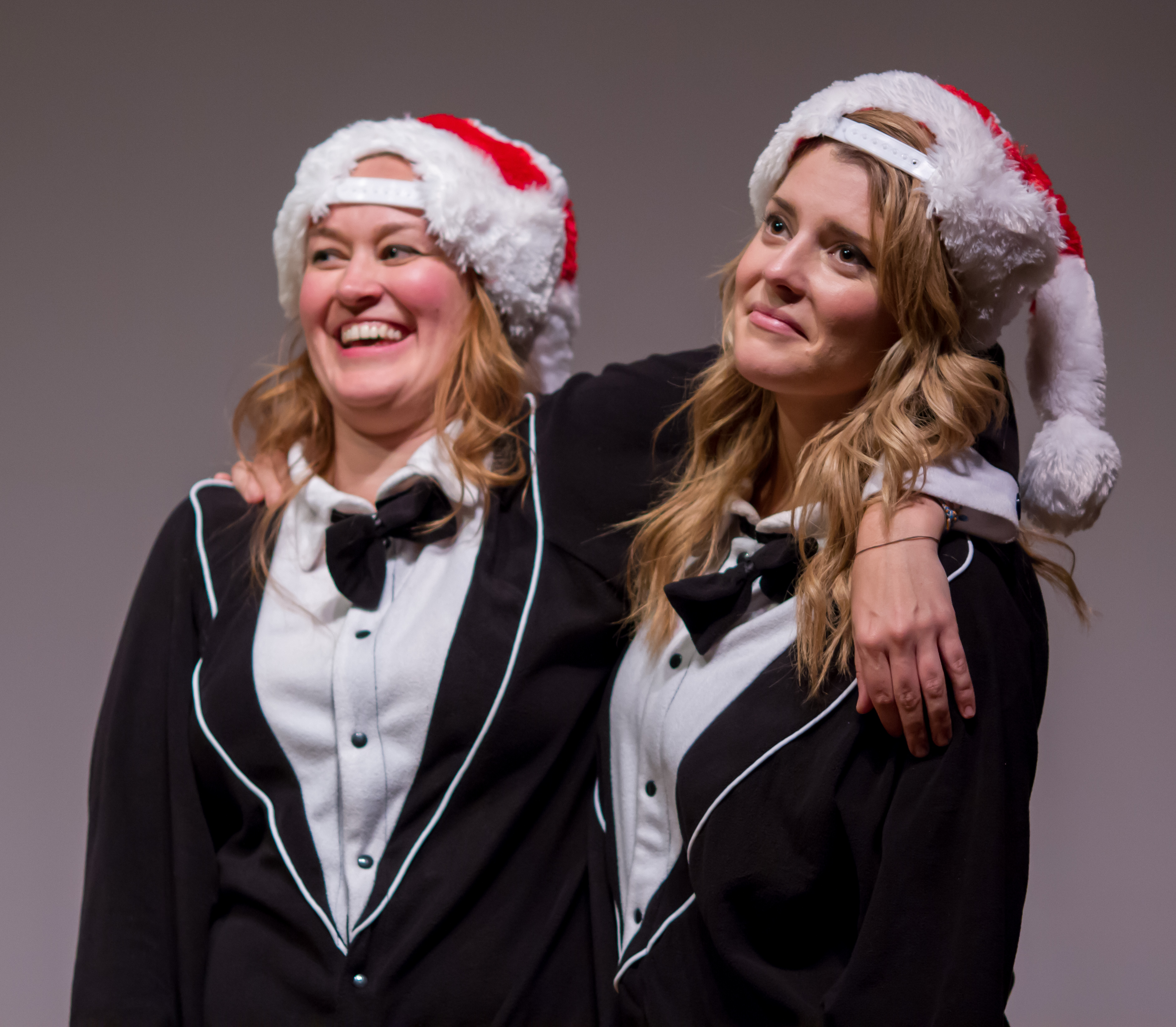
Mamrie Hart and Helbig onstage at No Filter in December 2013

In addition to her web and television content, Helbig has performed live on stage in various formats throughout the United States, Canada, England, Ireland and Australia, including the following:

In 2011, Helbig co-hosted the monthly live late night stage show Morning Show with Jacob "Hobart" Brown.

On January 15, 2013, Helbig participated on stage as part of "An Evening of Awesome" with John and Hank Green, Neil Gaiman, Hannah Hart, Ashley Clements and Daniel Vincent Gordh.

During May, June and December 2013, August, October and November 2014, and May and June 2015, Helbig (along with Hannah Hart and Mamrie Hart) embarked on a live comedy show across America titled #NoFilterShow. Their show ventured overseas to London and Dublin in May 2014 and to Australia in December 2015. They encouraged people to film and document the show and incorporated the use of social media by using internet comments and Twitter mentions in crowd games.

On March 15, 2014, Helbig and Mamrie Hart performed a one-off live comedy show, This Might Get Weird, Y'all in Boston. In November and December 2014, Helbig and Hart took the show on the road, performing in five US cities in support of Helbig's newly published book Grace's Guide. Helbig and Hart performed their show at Stream Con NYC on October 30, 2015. Helbig and Hart took their show overseas to London and Dublin in late November 2016.

On July 25, 2014, Helbig performed along with comedians Steve Agee and Brian Posehn at San Diego's Comic Con as a part of Comedy Central presents "@midnight".

In 2014, Helbig and Hannah Hart hosted the 4th Annual Streamy Awards. Helbig hosted the Streamy Awards again in 2015, this time with Tyler Oakley as her co-host. The Streamys aired for the first time on television, on VH1.

On September 26, 2015, Helbig recorded an episode of her Not Too Deep podcast (with guest Harley Morenstein) in front of a live audience in Toronto as part of the JFL42 comedy festival.

On October 22, 2015, Helbig told a story in front of a live audience at the NerdMelt Showroom for the Risk! podcast.

On February 4, 2016, Helbig read excerpts from her book Grace & Style: The Art of Pretending You Have It and was interviewed in front of a live audience as part of New Hampshire Public Radio's series Writers on a New England Stage at The Music Hall in Portsmouth, New Hampshire.

On June 24, 2016, Helbig performed in a live stage reading at VIDCON for Writing with Grace. There was a 2,500 person live audience for the event with co stars Michael Buckley, Hank Green, Hannah Hart, Mamrie Hart and Harley Morenstein. The live show was directed by Rachel Myers and Kelly Landry. The live show won the 2016 Streamy Award for Best Brand Campaign.

== Personal life ==
Helbig began a relationship with fellow YouTube personality Elliott Morgan in January 2019. On February 28, 2021, Helbig announced via Instagram that she and Morgan were engaged. The couple married on October 1, 2022, in Las Vegas and announced it via Instagram the next day.

On her 41st birthday, Helbig called for "justice for Nolan Wells" and "freedom for Palestine" and she hopes the Cornell 7 "rot in absolute hell".

=== Health ===
On July 3, 2023, Helbig announced that she had been diagnosed with triple-positive breast cancer. She said it was "super treatable and highly beatable", and said she would undergo chemotherapy, surgery, and hormone therapy..

In October 2026, following numbness in her leg, Helbig was diagnosed with two brain tumors. Helbig shared she is having brain surgery and chemotherapy. Her brain surgery took place successfully on October 15.

In November 2026, Helbig gave an update. Her breast cancer had metastasized to her brain, which caused the two brain tumors and resulted in her being "automatically bumped up to stage 4", though she is N.E.D. ("No Evidence of Disease"). In the month following the surgery, Helbig had five sessions of radiation therapy. She also states that she has a sonolucent plate in her head, allowing for ultrasounds of her brain.

== Awards and nominations ==
Helbig has received various accolades in recognition of her web videos and comedic content, including the following:

- DailyGrace was elected "King of the Web" in October 2011.
- Helbig's personal Twitter was listed in the Humor section of Time's "140 Best Twitter Feeds of 2012".
- Helbig was listed among BuzzFeed's "11 Awesome Up-And-Coming Funny Ladies You Should Know".
- She was named one of the "30 Under 30 Rising Stars in Los Angeles" by Refinery29 in July 2013.
- Helbig was listed in the entertainment section of Forbes' "30 Under 30 Who Are Changing the World 2014".
- Helbig was named one of the "100 Most Creative People In Business 2014" according to Fast Company magazine.
- She was listed among The Hollywood Reporter's "Silicon Beach Power 25: A Ranking of L.A.'s Top Digital Media Players" in May 2014.
- Helbig was named one of Variety's "10 Comics to Watch" in June 2014.
- She was listed among Social Media Week Los Angeles' "Social 25" digital media influencers and organizations in September 2014.
- In 2014, Helbig's YouTube Channel was listed on New Media Rockstars Top 100 Channels, ranked at #36.
- In March 2015, she was named one of Time's "30 Most Influential People on the Internet".
- In April 2015, she was named one of Vulture's "50 Comedians You Should Know in 2015".
- In July 2015, she was named one of The Hollywood Reporter's "Top 25 Digital Stars".
- In July 2015, she was listed among Adweek's "Creative 100" in the "10 Viral Content Creators" category.
- In October 2016, she was listed among Variety's "Hollywood's New Leaders" in the "Creators" category.

Year	Ceremony	Category	Work	Result	Ref.
2012	IAWTV Awards	Best Writing (Non-Fiction)	DailyGrace	Nominated	
2013	IAWTV Awards	Best Host (Taped)	DailyGrace	Won	
2013	IAWTV Awards	Best Hosted (Taped) Web Series	DailyGrace	Won	
2013	IAWTV Awards	Best Writing (Non-Fiction)	DailyGrace	Nominated	
2013	Streamy Awards	Best First-Person Series	DailyGrace	Won	
2013	Streamy Awards	Audience Choice Personality of the Year		Won	
2014	Webby Awards	First Person – People's Voice	it'sGrace	Won	
2014	Teen Choice Awards	Choice Web Star: Female		Nominated	
2014	Streamy Awards	First Person		Nominated	
2014	Streamy Awards	Audience Choice Entertainer of the Year		Nominated	
2014	Goodreads Choice Awards	Best Humor	Grace's Guide	Nominated	
2015	Webby Awards	First Person – People's Voice	it'sGrace	Nominated	
2015	Teen Choice Awards	Choice Web Star: Female		Nominated	
2015	Streamy Awards	First Person Series		Nominated	
2015	Streamy Awards	Non-Fiction	HeyUSA	Nominated	
2015	Streamy Awards	Collaboration	Epic Rap Battles of History	Won	
2015	Streamy Awards	Audience Choice Entertainer of the Year		Nominated	
2015	People's Choice Awards	Favorite YouTube Star		Nominated	
2015	WIN Awards	Comedy Series	The Grace Helbig Show	Nominated	
2016	Shorty Awards	Best Podcast	Not Too Deep with Grace Helbig	Nominated	
2016	Streamy Awards	First Person		Nominated	
2016	Streamy Awards	Actress	Electra Woman & Dyna Girl	Nominated	
2016	Streamy Awards	Brand Campaign	Writing With Grace	Won	
2018	Streamy Awards	Podcast	Not Too Deep with Grace Helbig	Won	
2019	Shorty Awards	Web Series	This Might Get	Won	

== Books ==
In October 2014, Helbig's self-penned comedic self-help handbook for Millennials, Grace's Guide: The Art of Pretending to Be a Grown-up, was published by Touchstone, an imprint of Simon & Schuster. The book debuted at number one on the New York Times Best Seller Advice, How-To and Miscellaneous list.

On February 2, 2016, Helbig's second book, Grace & Style: The Art of Pretending You Have It, was published by Touchstone. The book debuted at number seven on the New York Times Best Seller Advice, How-To and Miscellaneous list.

Preceded by Mary Ellen Thomas	Voice of Cindy Bear; 2021-present	Succeeded by None
