= Hannah Hart =

American internet personality, comedian, author, and actress

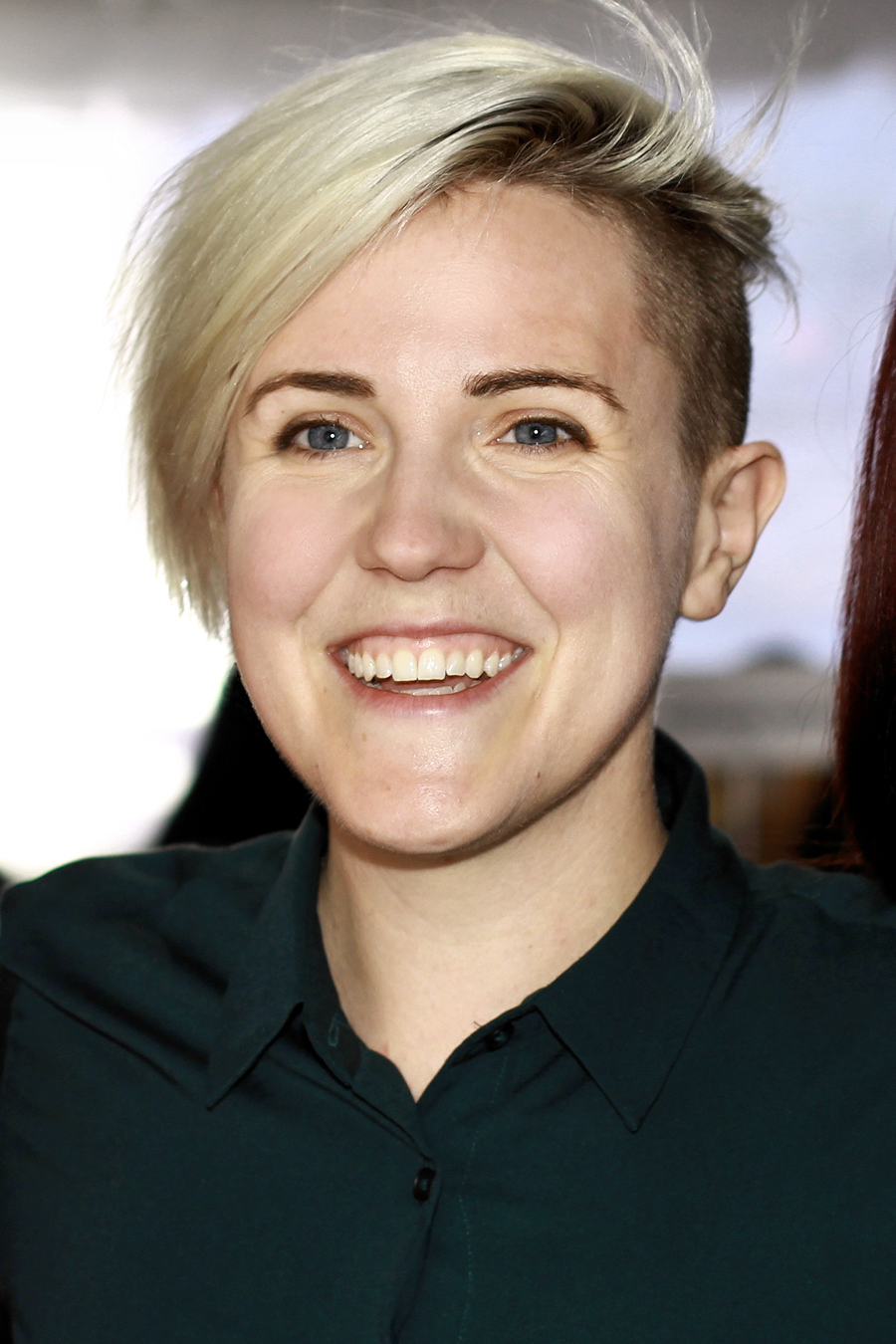
- Hart at the 2019 Texas Book Festival
- Born: Hannah Maud Hart; November 2, 1986 (age 40); Palo Alto, California, U.S.
- Education: University of California, Berkeley
- Occupations: Internet personality; comedian; actress; cook; author
- Spouse: Ella Mielniczenko (m. 2021; div. 2023)

YouTube information
- Channel: Harto
- Years active: 2011–present
- Genre: Comedy
- Subscribers: 2.15 million
- Views: 338 million
- Last updated: February 19, 2026
- Website: hannahhart.com

Hannah Maud Hart (born November 2, 1986) is an American Internet personality, comedian, author, cook, and actress. She is known for starring in My Drunk Kitchen, a weekly series on YouTube in which she cooks something while intoxicated, which ended in November 2021. She also runs a second channel where she talks about life in general and gives her opinions on various topics. She co-produced and starred in the independent comedy film Camp Takota, released in 2014. She wrote a parody cookbook which was a New York Times bestseller for five weeks in August–September 2014. She is a 2017 recipient of the Alex Awards.

== Early life ==
Hart was born and raised in the San Francisco Bay Area. Her parents separated when she was an infant, and Hart and her sister were raised by their mother, who suffered from psychosis.

Hart graduated from the University of California, Berkeley in May 2009 having majored in both English literature and Japanese linguistics. Upon her graduation, Hart moved to San Francisco to live with her best friend and Hannalyze This podcast co-host, Hannah Gelb. She later moved to Brooklyn, New York, to pursue a writing career. She ended up proofreading Japanese and English for a Manhattan-based translating firm instead of her initial dream of writing screenplays. Within two months of launching her YouTube channel, she ended up quitting her 9-to-5 job in order to focus on My Drunk Kitchen.

== Career ==
=== 2011: Launch of My Drunk Kitchen ===
My Drunk Kitchen traces its beginnings to March 2011, when Hart was at her sister's home, chatting with a friend over a webcam. Hart used her Macintosh computer to record herself drinking wine while attempting to make a grilled cheese sandwich without any cheese. Hart uploaded the video to YouTube as My Drunk Kitchen. Viewers began asking for another "episode" of the video, and Hart complied with more recordings. To establish the initial upload as the first episode of a series, she renamed it "Butter Yo Shit." By July 2011, My Drunk Kitchen had gathered 800,000 views. Hart has hosted several celebrity guests on My Drunk Kitchen, including British chef Jamie Oliver, actress Mary-Louise Parker, actor/host Chris Hardwick, video blogger Tyler Oakley, former NSYNC member Lance Bass, and author John Green, who subsequently wrote the foreword to Hart's cookbook. Comedian Sarah Silverman was also featured in the show in December 2014 in an episode which demonstrated the therapeutic and medicinal use of cannabis. New episodes of My Drunk Kitchen are uploaded each Thursday on Hart's main channel. In 2013, at the 3rd Streamy Awards, Hart won the Streamy Award for Best Female Performance in a Comedy. In 2014, Hart co-hosted the 4th Streamy Awards with her colleague Grace Helbig. My Drunk Kitchen would also win the presentation's award for best comedy. As of June 2015, her channel MyHarto had over 2.3 million subscribers and over 206 million views.

=== 2013: Hello Harto, No Filter, Camp Takota ===
On January 2, 2013, Hannah posted a video on YouTube stating that she was considering doing a world tour. She launched a campaign to fund this trip on Indiegogo, aiming to raise $50,000 within a month. After a couple of hours, the $50,000 goal had already been met. Hart decided to keep the funding going until her initial end date of February 2, 2013. Depending on the final amount of money, the tour would be expanded to Canada, Europe, and Australia. By February 2, she had raised over $220,000. The first leg of the tour kicked off in April 2013.

Hello Harto: The Tour Show consists of three parts: vlog, travel, and kitchen. Hart uploads various videos about her traveling experience on her second YouTube channel, YourHarto. The vlog (a recap of the city she is in) gets uploaded each Tuesday to her main channel, MyHarto. The kitchen episodes, which she films at a host's house in the city she visits, are uploaded on Thursday, also to her main channel. The team consists of four people, Hannah Hart (host), Pearl Wible (producer), Sam Molleur (director), and Nick Underwood (RV driver). The theme song for the tour, written by Hart, was accompanied by a video of fans jaunting in front of their favorite places. The song is called "Don't Wait To Say Hello".

After receiving negative feedback from a minority of fans that complained about the lack of places at the meet-ups, Hannah uploaded a video called The Real Hello Harto on her main channel, giving her fans an exclusive look behind the screens of a regular day on the Hello Harto tour. The video explained the work that goes into making content videos, as well as shooting My Drunk Kitchen videos and meeting up with fans all over Canada and the United States.

In November 2014, Hart started uploading more episodes of her travel show in Australia and New Zealand. These episodes were from a trip she took almost a year before that was sponsored by Contiki, along with other content creators.

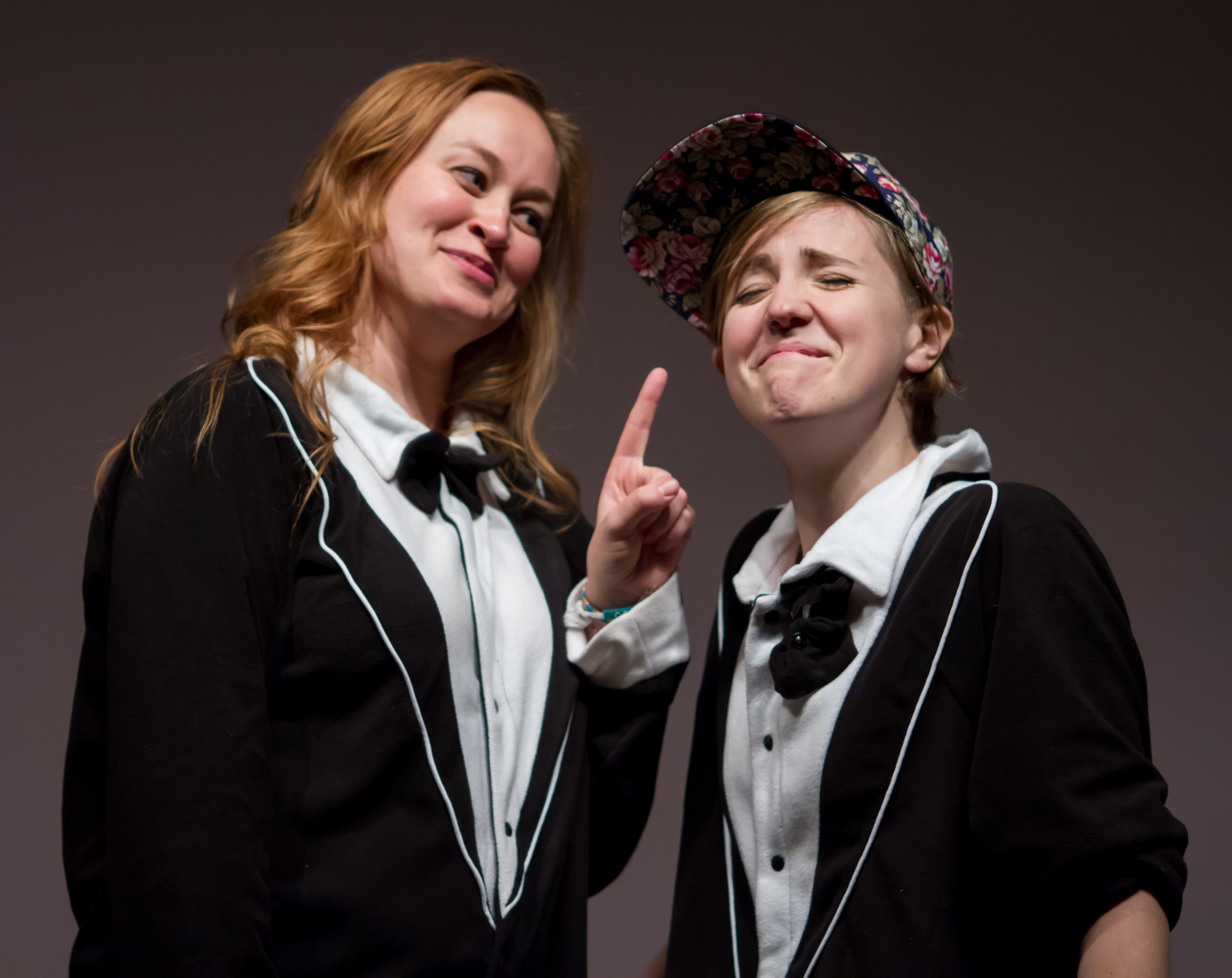
Mamrie Hart (no relation) and Hannah Hart onstage at No Filter in December 2013, held in Portland, Oregon

On February 2, 2013, Hannah Hart performed a comedy show in collaboration with best friends Grace Helbig and Mamrie Hart (no relation) at the NerdMelt, Los Angeles. The audience was encouraged to tape the show on their cameras and phones and upload it to social media websites with the tag #NoFilterShow. The show quickly gained popularity through Tumblr and YouTube. The 75-minute show was performed a second time at PlayList Live in March 2013. By this time, fans were generally demanding the show to go on tour - the trio decided to take #NoFilterShow on the road, syncing the tour dates with Hannah's Hello Harto. The #NoFilterShow returned for multiple more legs of shows, in August, October, and November 2014, and again in summer 2015. The show also ventured overseas to London and Dublin.

On August 2, 2013, Hart announced on the main stage at VidCon 2013 that she would be starring in her first feature film alongside friends Grace Helbig and Mamrie Hart. The comedy film Camp Takota follows Elise (played by Grace) as a young woman who is forced to leave her big city job and head back to her old summer camp where she is reunited with old friends Allison (played by Hannah) and Maxine (played by Mamrie). The film, directed by Chris and Nick Riedell, began shooting in California on August 12, 2013. Michael Goldfine of Rockstream Studios produced the film along with eight others including Hart, Helbig and Mamrie who served as executive producers. The film's official trailer was released on December 24, 2013. Camp Takota was released via digital download on the movie's website on February 14, 2014. Netflix picked up the movie to be streamed on their platform on December 1, 2014.

=== 2014–present: Further work ===
In August 2014, Hart released her first parody self-help book, a companion volume to My Drunk Kitchen. The book was titled My Drunk Kitchen: A Guide to Eating, Drinking, and Going with Your Gut. The cookbook entered the New York Times bestsellers list at No. 6 in the "Advice, How-To & Miscellaneous" category, and stayed on it for two more weeks in August 2014. Publishers Weekly recognized the book as rising to No. 3 on their hardcover nonfiction list, opining that the book was not so much a cookbook as a pep talk for friends, a self-help book. Author John Green wrote the foreword, saying, "I defy anyone to read this surprisingly useful book and not come away from it madly in love with [Hart]."

Hart wrote a memoir titled Buffering: Unshared Tales of a Life Fully Loaded. The book was released through HarperCollins Publishing on October 18, 2016. It debuted at #4 on the New York Times Best Sellers list in the print hardcover category.

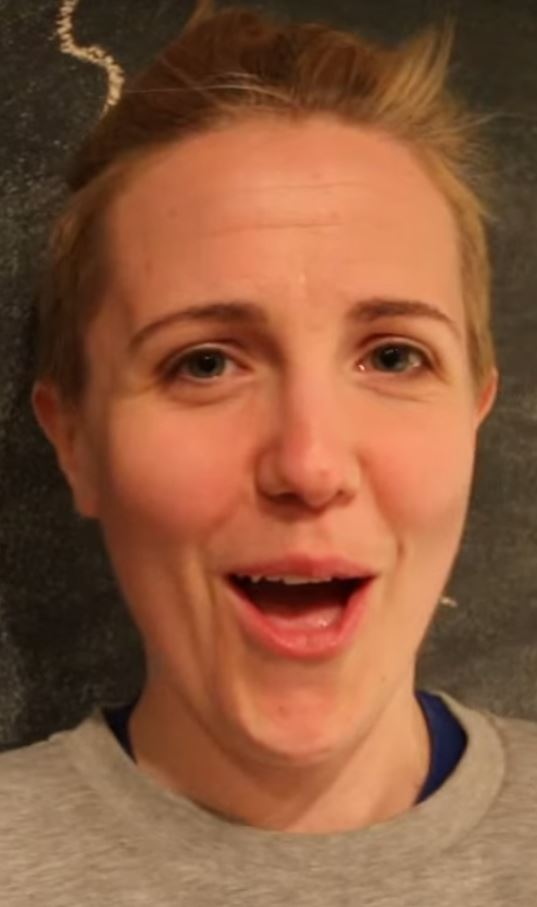
Hart appearing in a Vlogbrothers video in 2016.

On February 26, 2015, it was announced via various media outlets that Hart would co-star with Grace Helbig in a reboot of the 1970s Sid and Marty Krofft live-action science fiction children's television series Electra Woman and Dyna Girl.

Hart voices the part of Temp bot in the animated web series Bee and PuppyCat in the episode "Farmer" which aired November 6, 2014.

On October 28, 2015, Hart announced that she, along with Grace Helbig and Mamrie Hart, were making a movie that is being produced by Lions Gate Entertainment. The movie is called Dirty 30 and is about a house party gone wrong. The movie was released on September 23, 2016. The LA Times writer Katie Walsh writes, "In Dirty 30, Grace Helbig, Hannah Hart, and Mamrie Hart showcase their rapid-fire, quippy personalities." She leads up to a first look deal with Lionsgate.

In June 2016, Hart was a guest judge for Season 12 of Food Network Star. Her television series, I Hart Food, premiered on August 14, 2017. Six shows featured Hannah tasting food in New Mexico, North Carolina, Maine, Oregon, Minnesota, and Montana.

In April 2019, it was announced that Hart would be hosting a new show with Ellen Digital Network, A Decent Proposal. The show airs on Ellen DeGeneres' EllenTube platform as well as on the 'TheEllenShow' YouTube channel.

In October 2019, Hart began a BuzzFeed Tasty video series called Edible History. Videos are uploaded weekly, in which Hart investigates and recreates ancient foods that are the basis of today's. Hart has recreated such recipes as the precursors of lasagna, croissants, burgers, and wonton soup.

Hart began streaming on Twitch in 2021, naming her channel "thishartomine".

== Discography ==
=== Singles ===
- "Show Me Where Ya Noms At" (2011)
- "Oh Internet" (2012)
- "Cheese Pleasin Me" (2012)
- "Ur the 1z" (2013)
- "Summer Jam" (2015)

Adapted from Bandcamp

== Personal life ==
Hart is a lesbian. On July 27, 2018 she announced her engagement to longtime girlfriend Ella Mielniczenko, with plans to wed in 2020 that they had to postpone due to the COVID-19 pandemic. They married on June 12, 2021. Hart filed for divorce from Mielniczenko on May 31, 2023, finalized in October of that year.

== Awards and nominations ==
Year	Ceremony	Category	Work	Result	Source
2013	5th Shorty Awards	Best of Social Media	Hannah Hart	Nominated	
2013	3rd Streamy Awards	Best Female Performance: Comedy	My Drunk Kitchen	Won	
2014	4th Streamy Awards	Best Comedy	My Drunk Kitchen	Won	
2016	8th Shorty Awards	Best in Food	Hannah Hart	Won	
2016	6th Streamy Awards	Actress	Hannah Hart	Nominated	
2018	10th Shorty Awards	Creator of the Decade	Hannah Hart	Nominated	
