= 4th Streamy Awards =

2014 awards ceremony recognizing online video

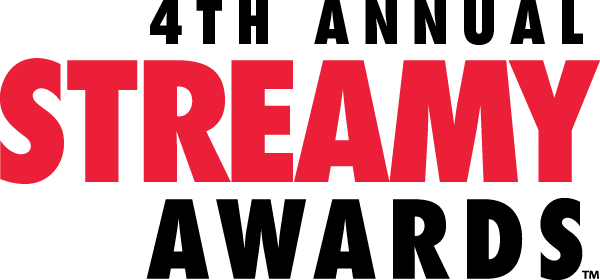
- Date: September 7, 2014
- Location: The Beverly Hilton; Beverly Hills, California
- Presented by: Streamys Blue Ribbon Panel
- Hosted by: Grace Helbig and Hannah Hart

Highlights
- Most awards: Video Game High School (3)
- Most nominations: Video Game High School (6)
- Audience Choice: EnchufeTV (Show of the Year); Tyler Oakley (Entertainer of the Year)

Television/radio coverage
- Network: YouTube
- Runtime: 2 hours, 30 minutes
- Viewership: 7 million
- Produced by: Dick Clark Productions; Tubefilter

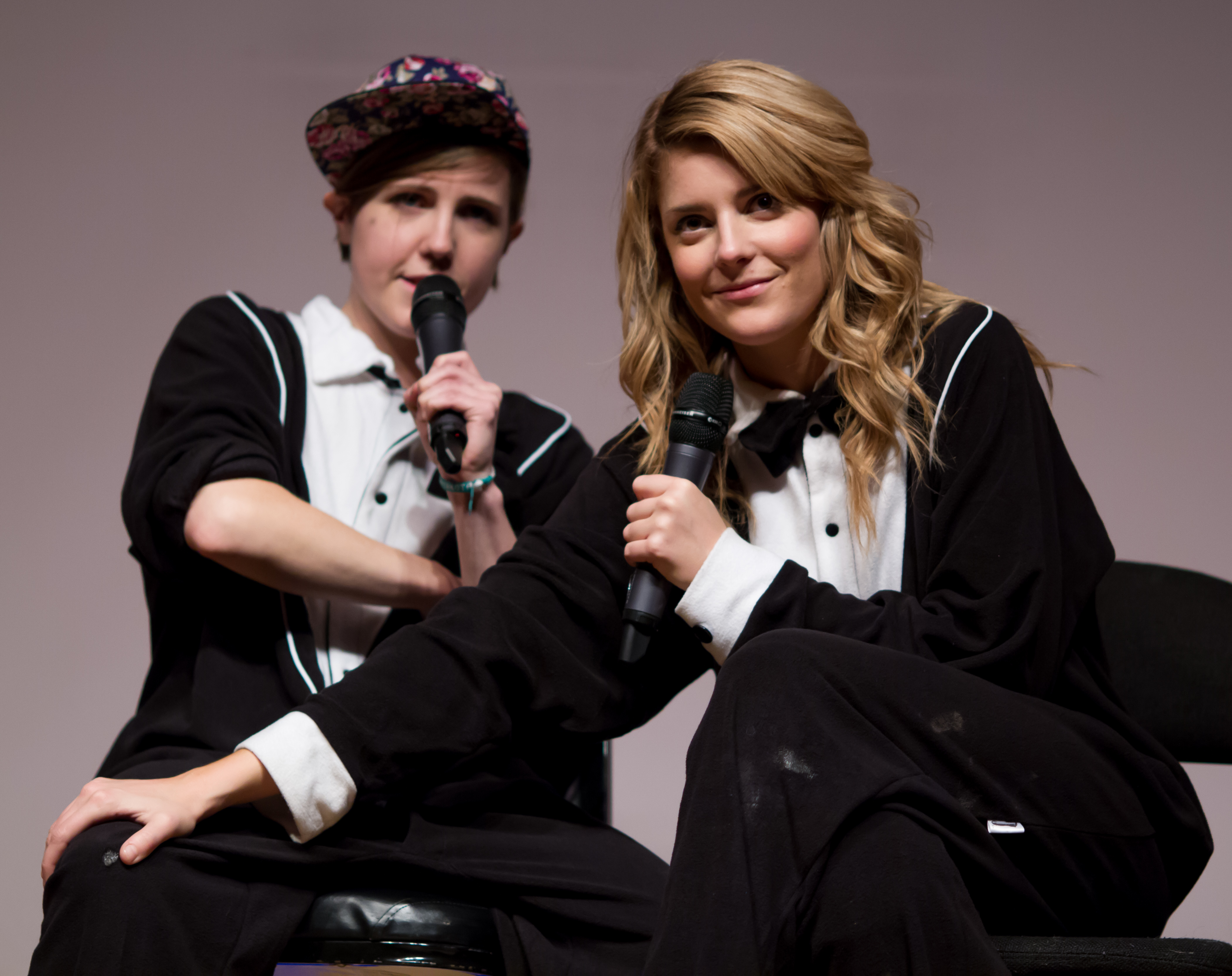
Hannah Hart and Grace Helbig hosted the show

The 4th Annual Streamy Awards was the fourth installment of the Streamy Awards honoring streaming television series. The awards were held on September 7, 2014 at The Beverly Hilton in Beverly Hills, California. They were hosted by the YouTube stars Grace Helbig and Hannah Hart. To reflect the industry as it had evolved since 2009, 10 new award categories were added, including multiple awards honoring the short-form video hosting website Vine, a new category to honor traditional TV media engaging in online content, and categories reflecting recent YouTube trends. The event also honored the American comedian Joan Rivers whose funeral had been earlier in the day and who many of the attendees had previously met on her web chat series In Bed With Joan, including Jenna Marbles, Tyler Oakley, and Grace Helbig, which was praised as a heartfelt moment of the show. The show was received well in media publications and generated a high level of social media interest, although it did receive criticism for the influence of sponsors at the event.

== Performers ==
The 4th Annual Streamy Awards featured the musical performances of the following artists:

Performers at the 4th Streamy Awards
Artist(s)	Song(s)
Pentatonix	"Problem"
Scott Bradlee & Postmodern Jukebox	Covers of Top 40 hits
Jhené Aiko	"The Pressure"
Starship (featuring Tiffany Alvord, Madilyn Bailey, Dave Days and Josh Golden)	"We Built This City" "Nothing's Gonna Stop Us Now"

== Winners and nominees ==
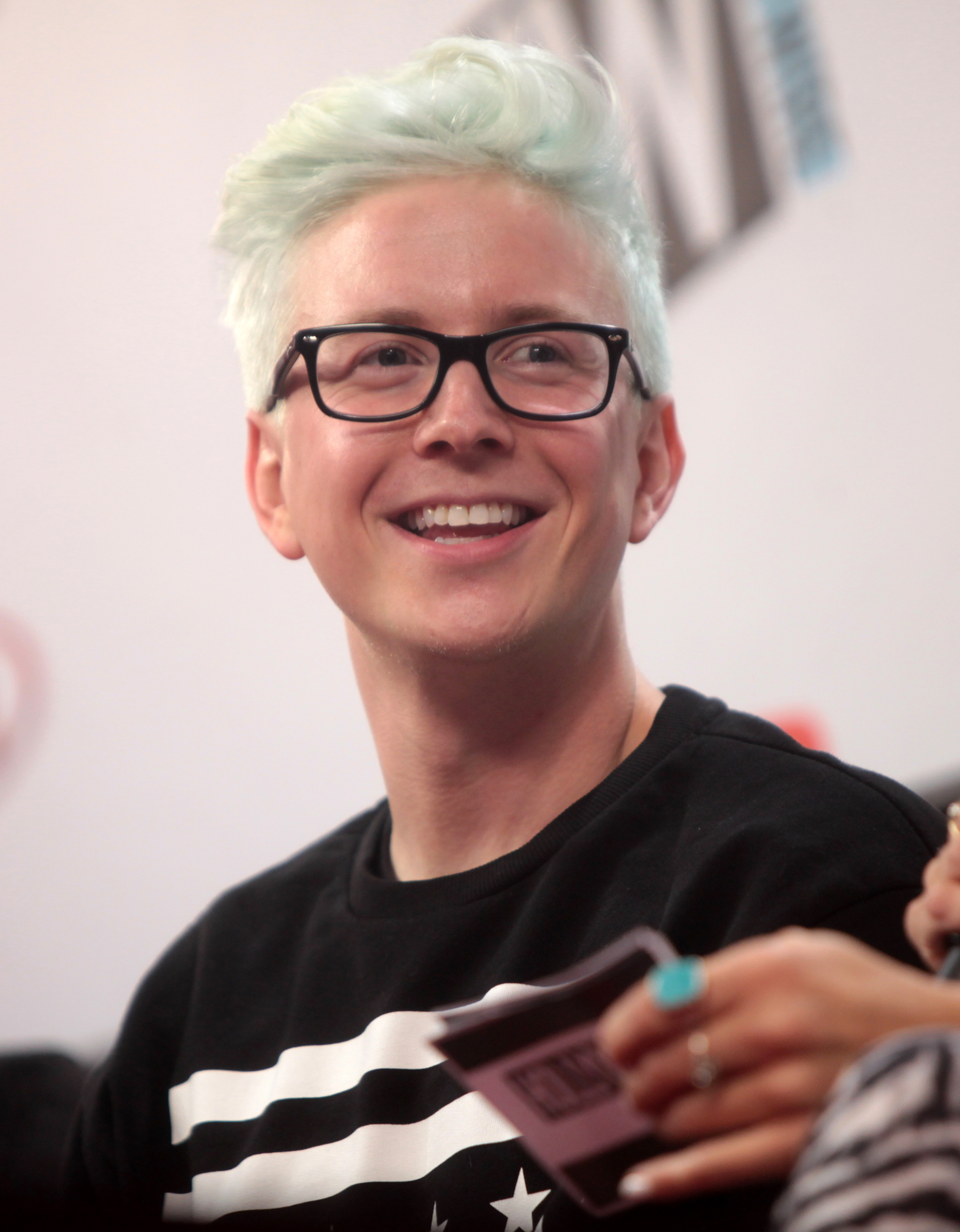
Tyler Oakley, winner of Entertainer of the Year and a Streamy Icon Award for his LGBT activism

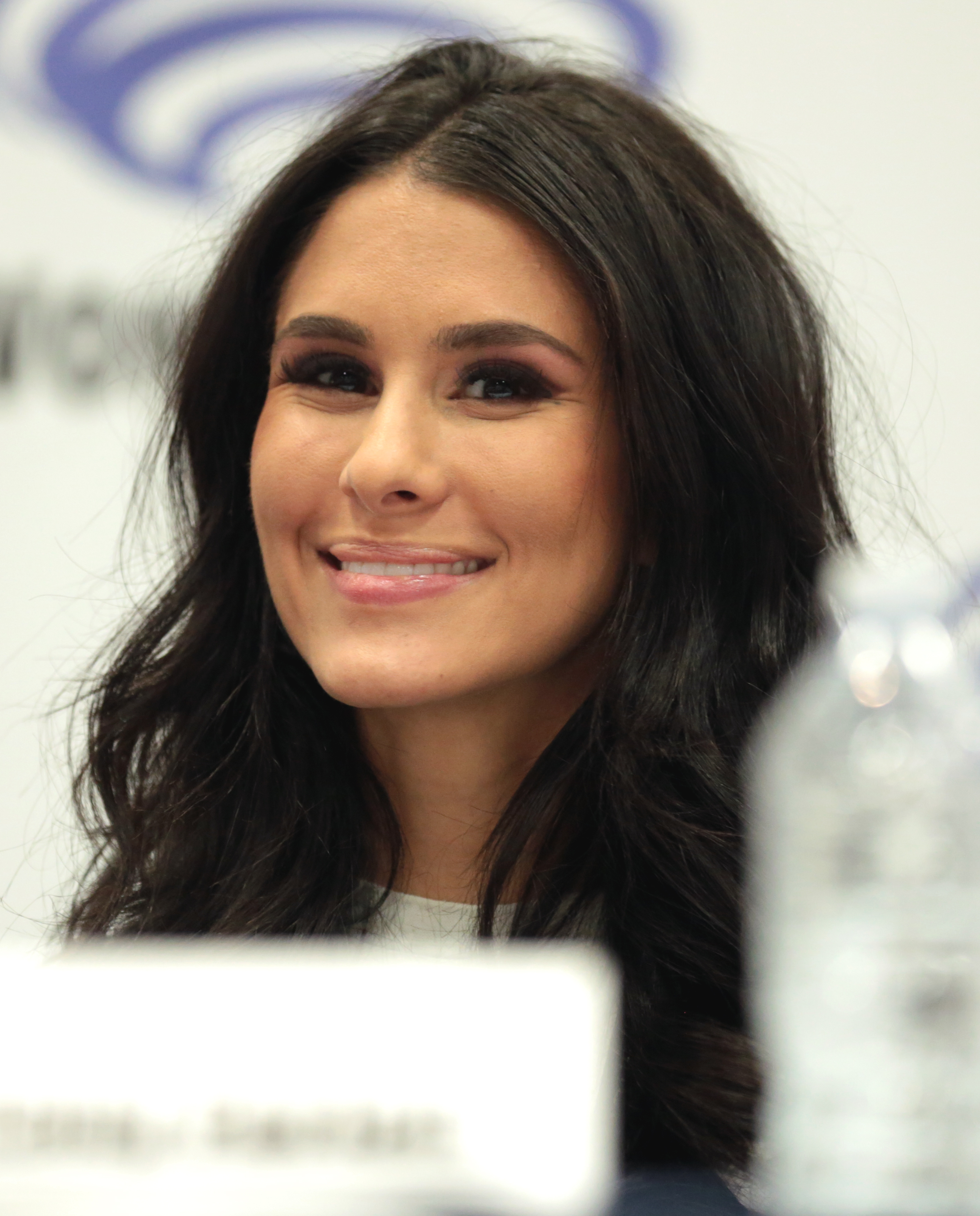
Brittany Furlan, winner of Viner of the Year

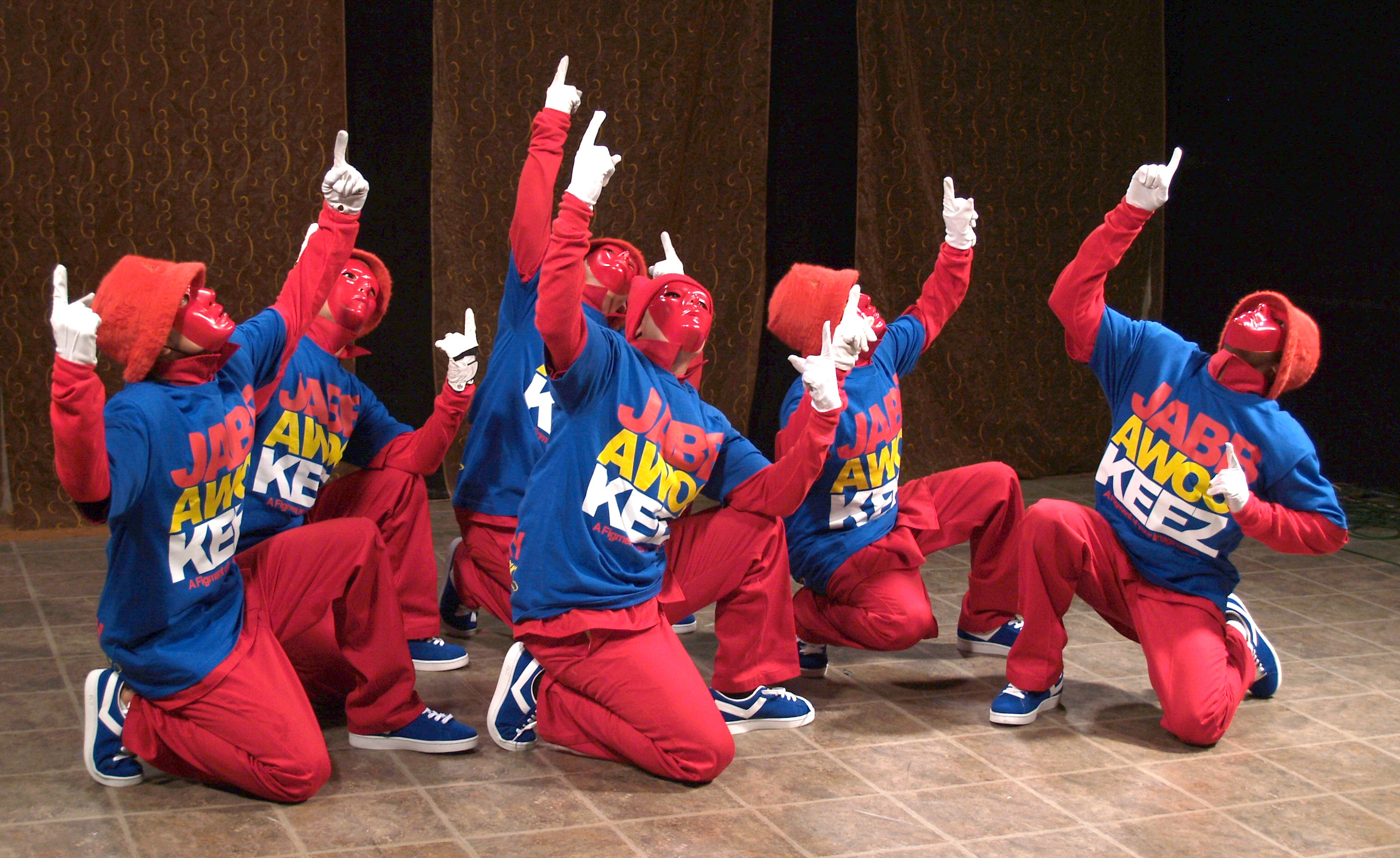
Jabbawockeez, winner of the Dance category

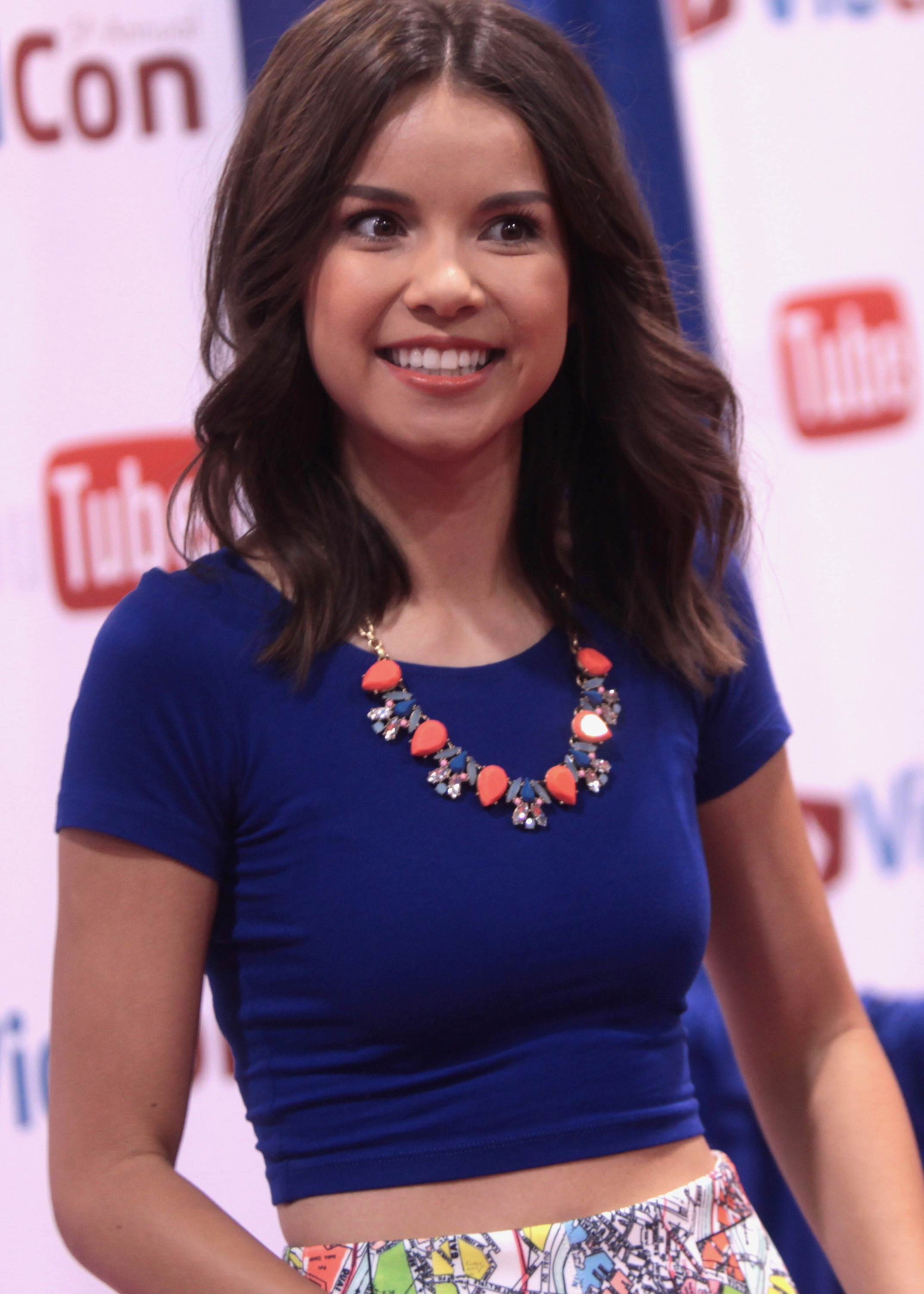
Ingrid Nilsen, winner of the Beauty category

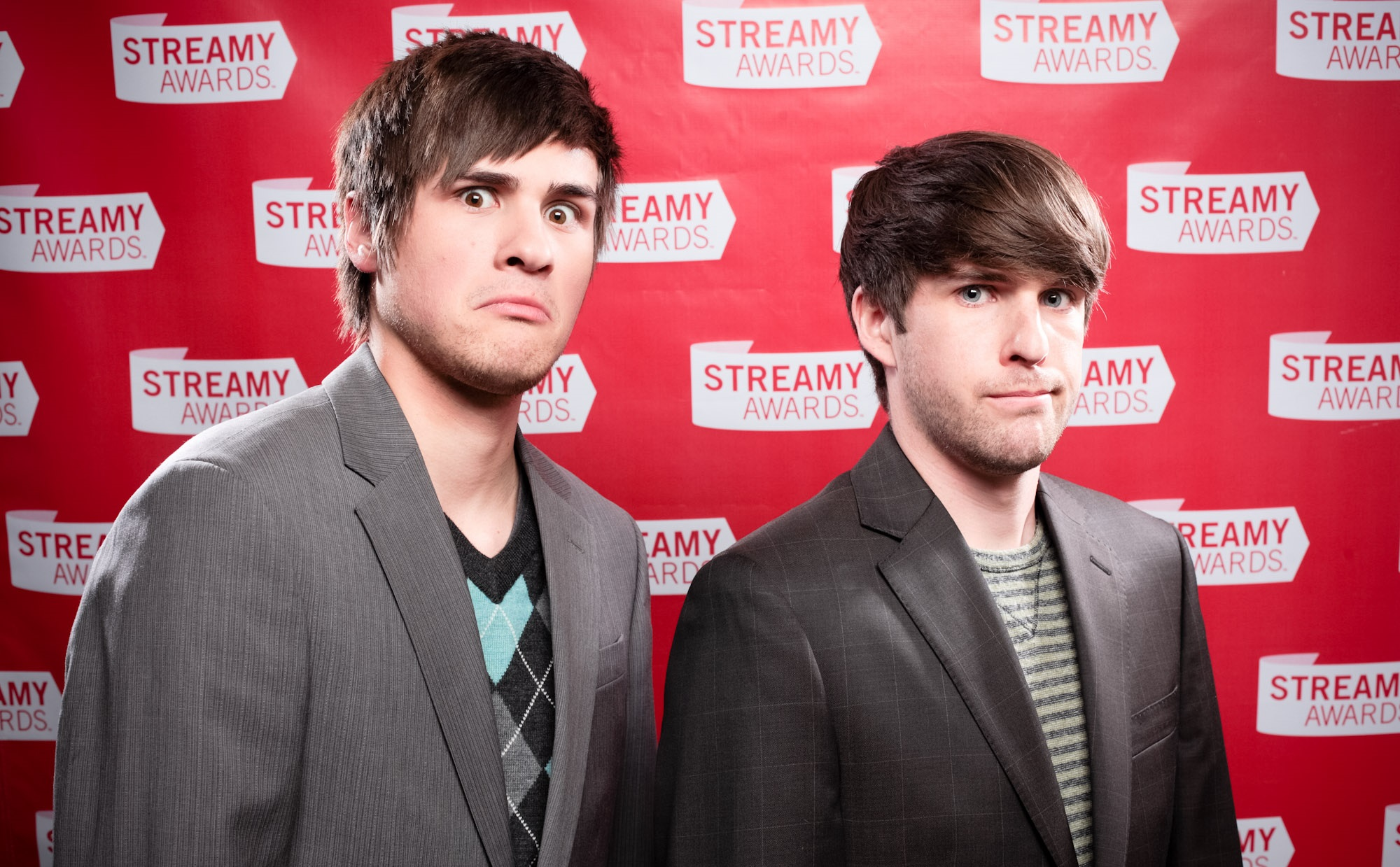
Smosh, winners of the Gaming category

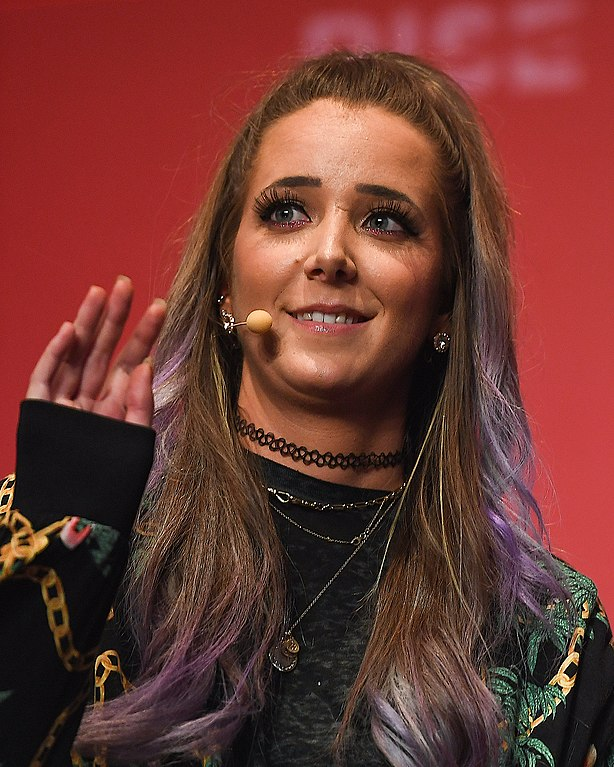
Jenna Marbles, winner of First Person category

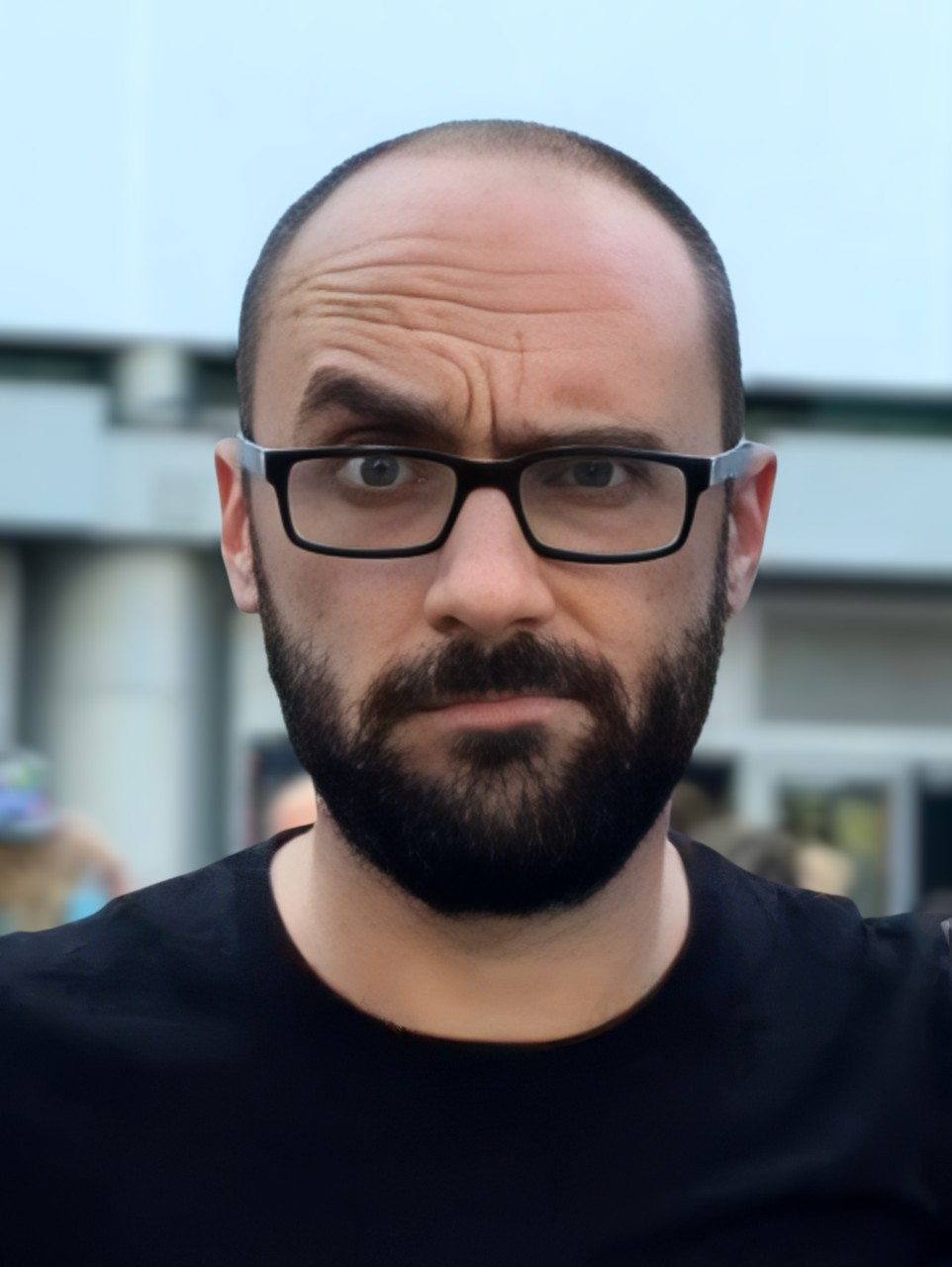
Vsauce, winner of the Science and Education category

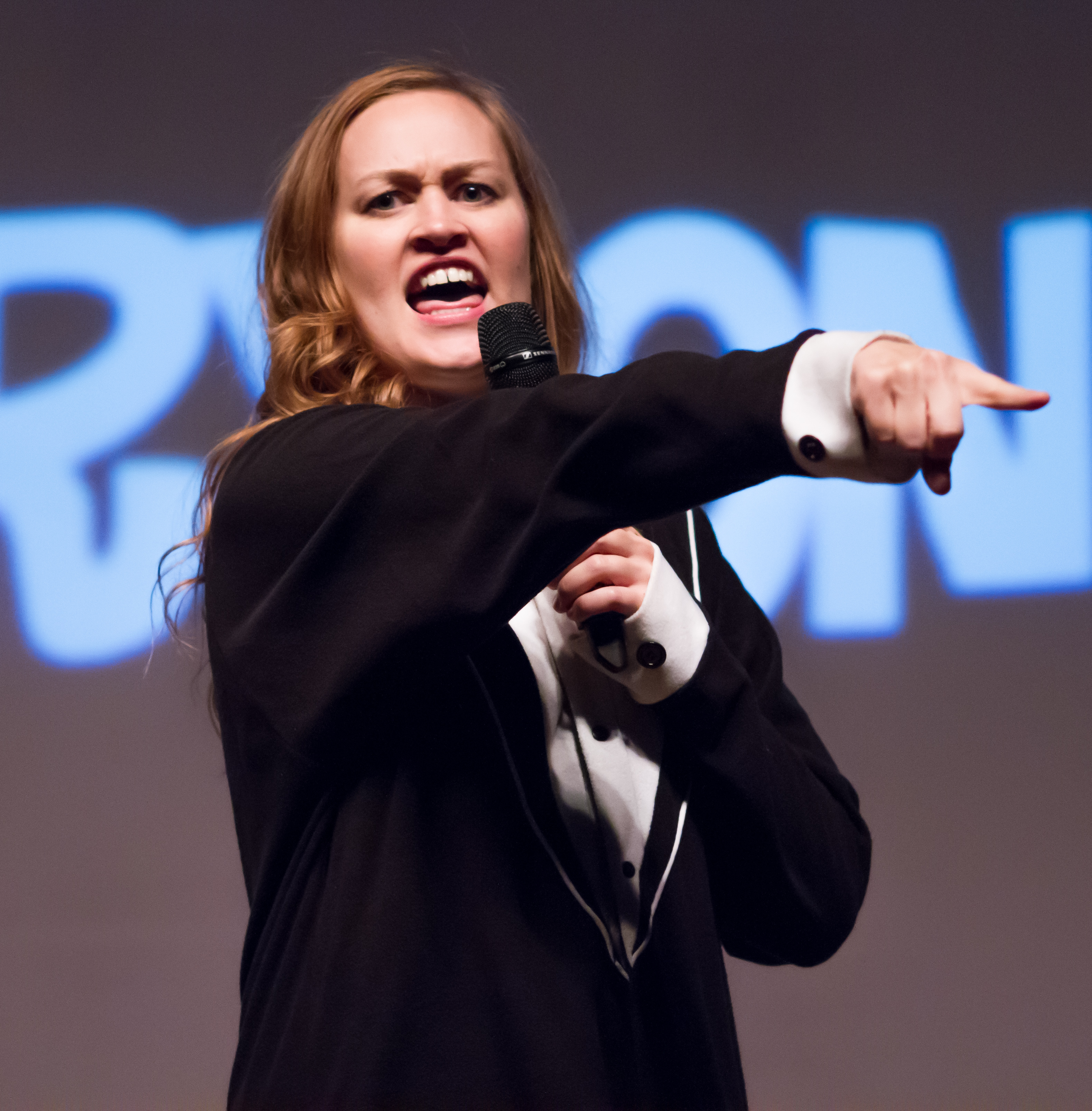
Mamrie Hart, winner of Actress in a Comedy

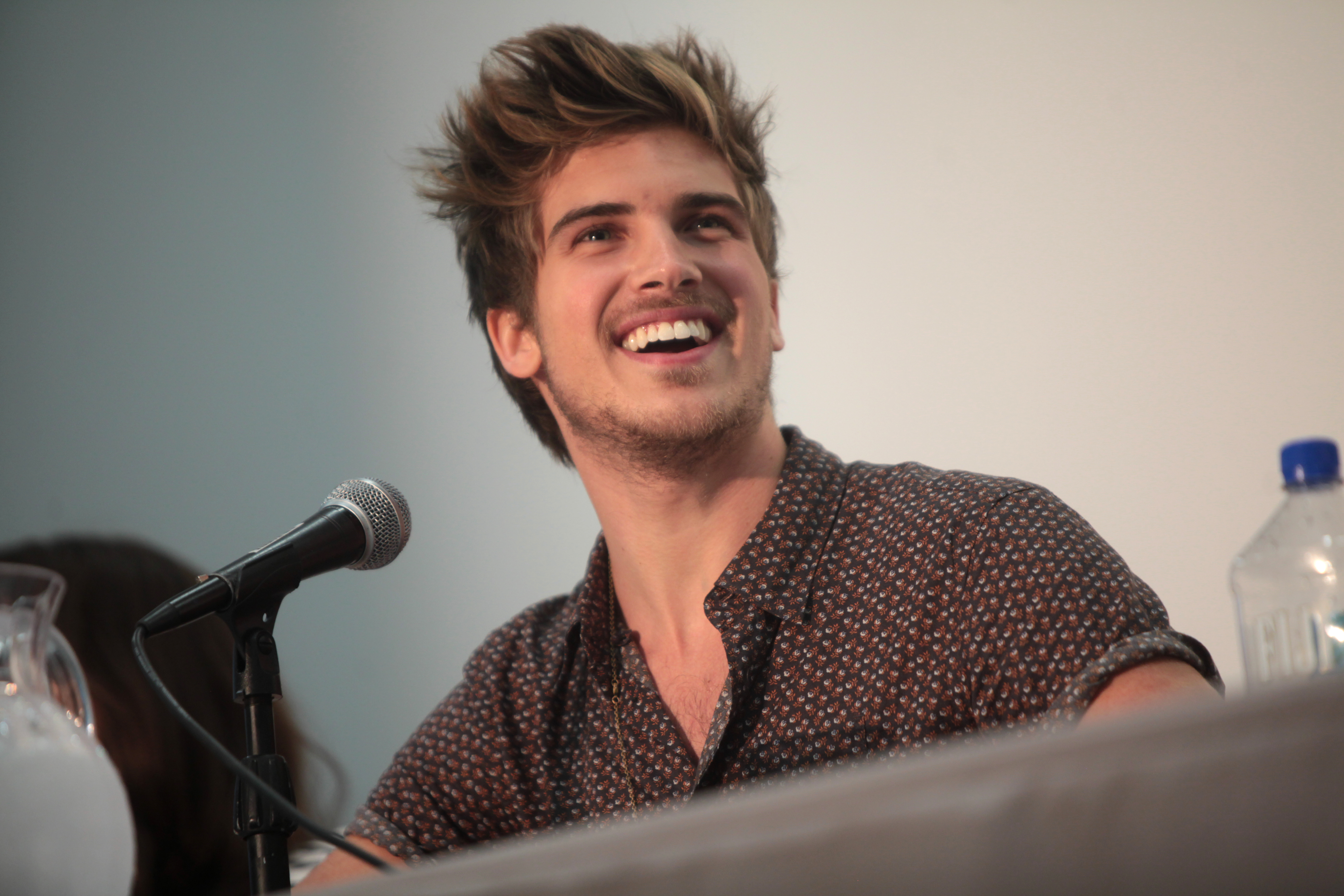
Joey Graceffa, winner of Actor in a Drama

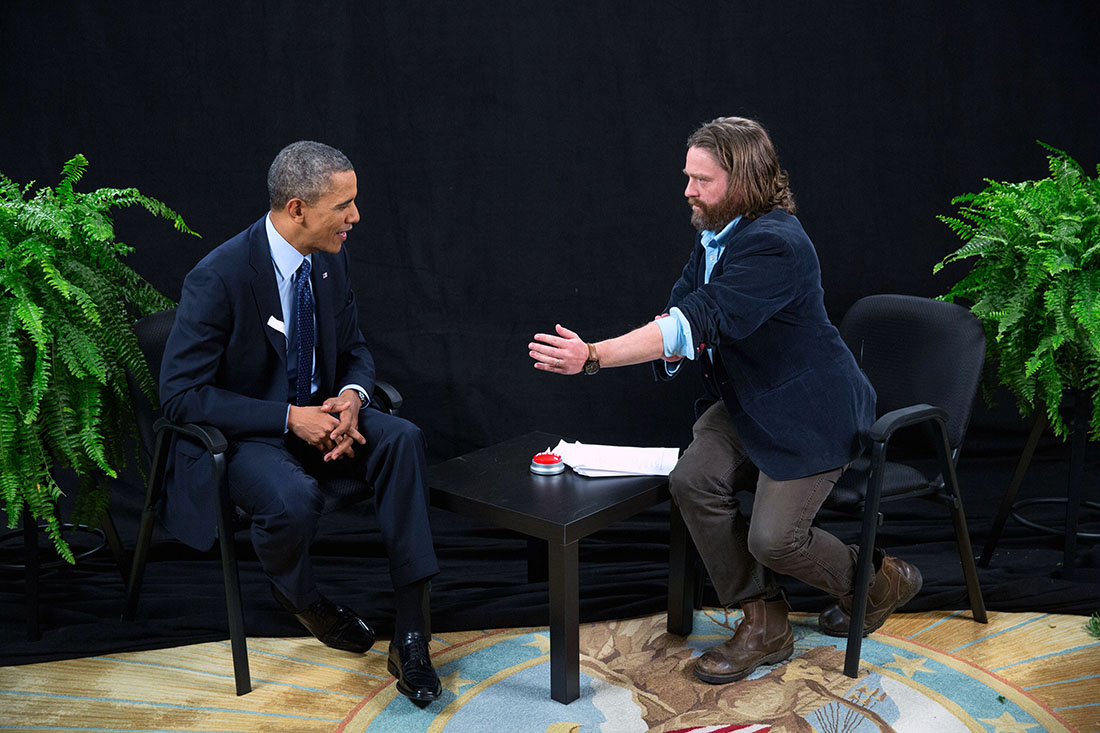
Zach Galifianakis and Barack Obama won the Collaboration category for an episode of Galifianakis' show Between Two Ferns

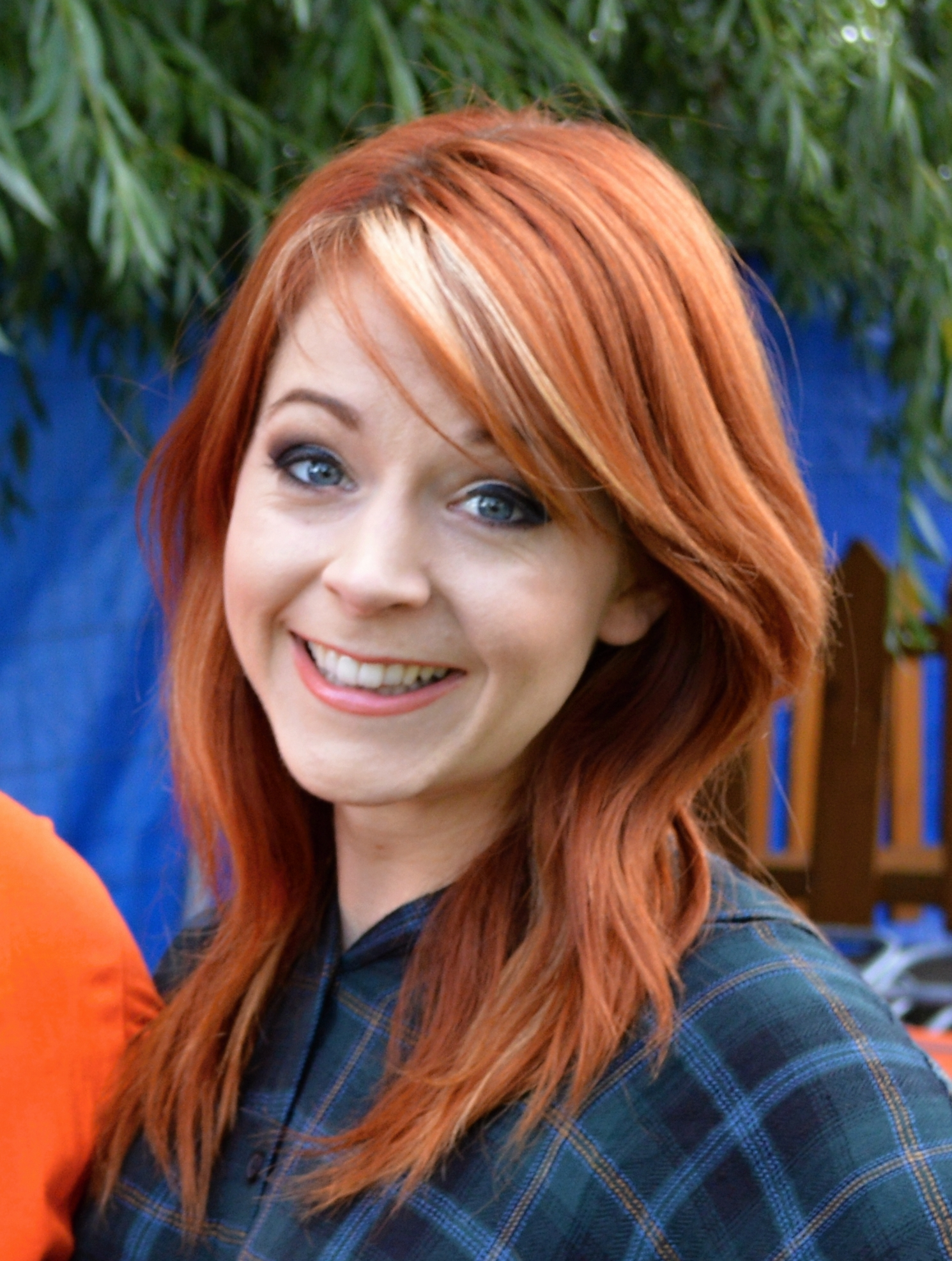
Lindsey Stirling, winner in the Musical Artist category

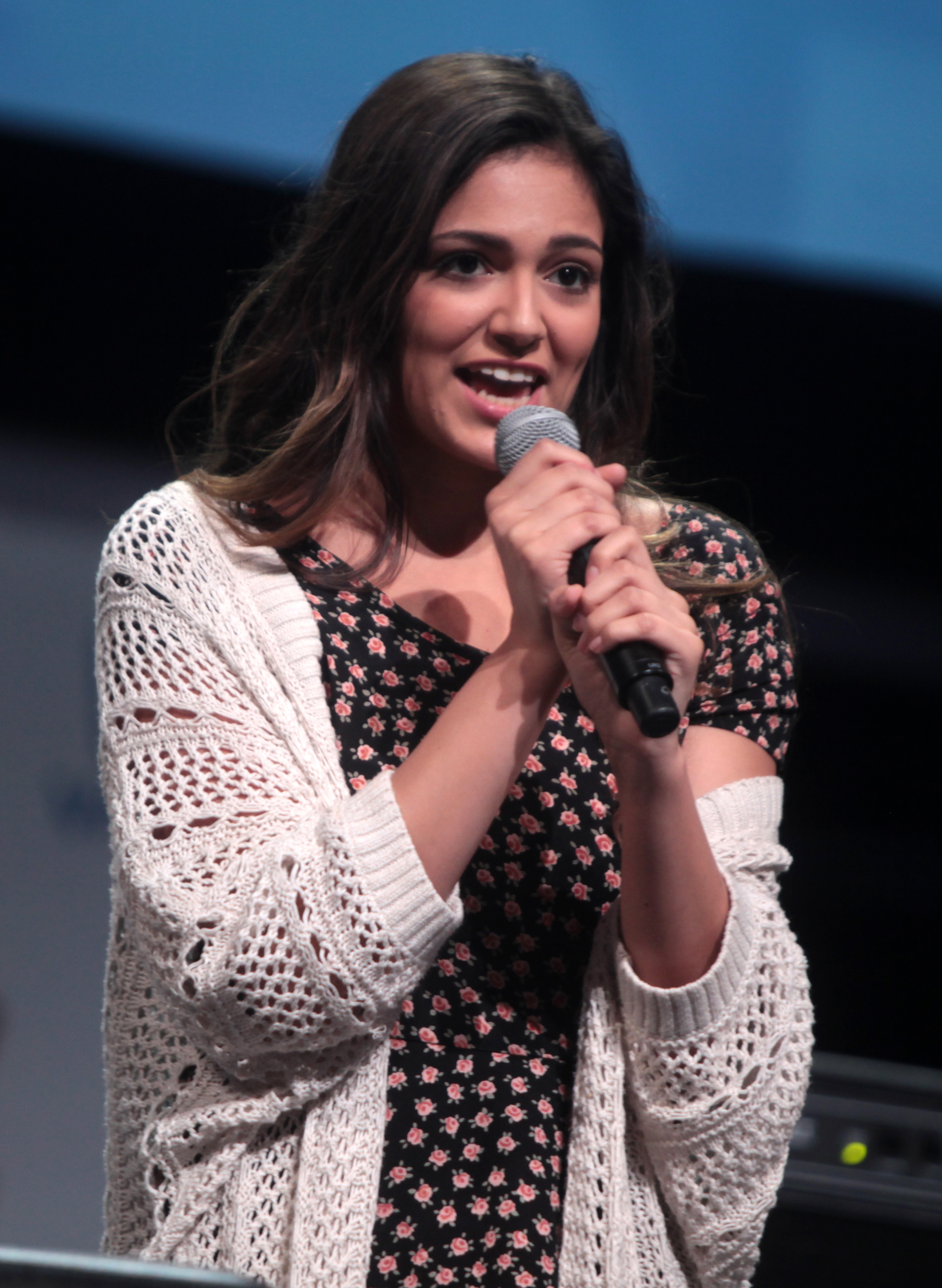
Bethany Mota, winner of the Fashion category

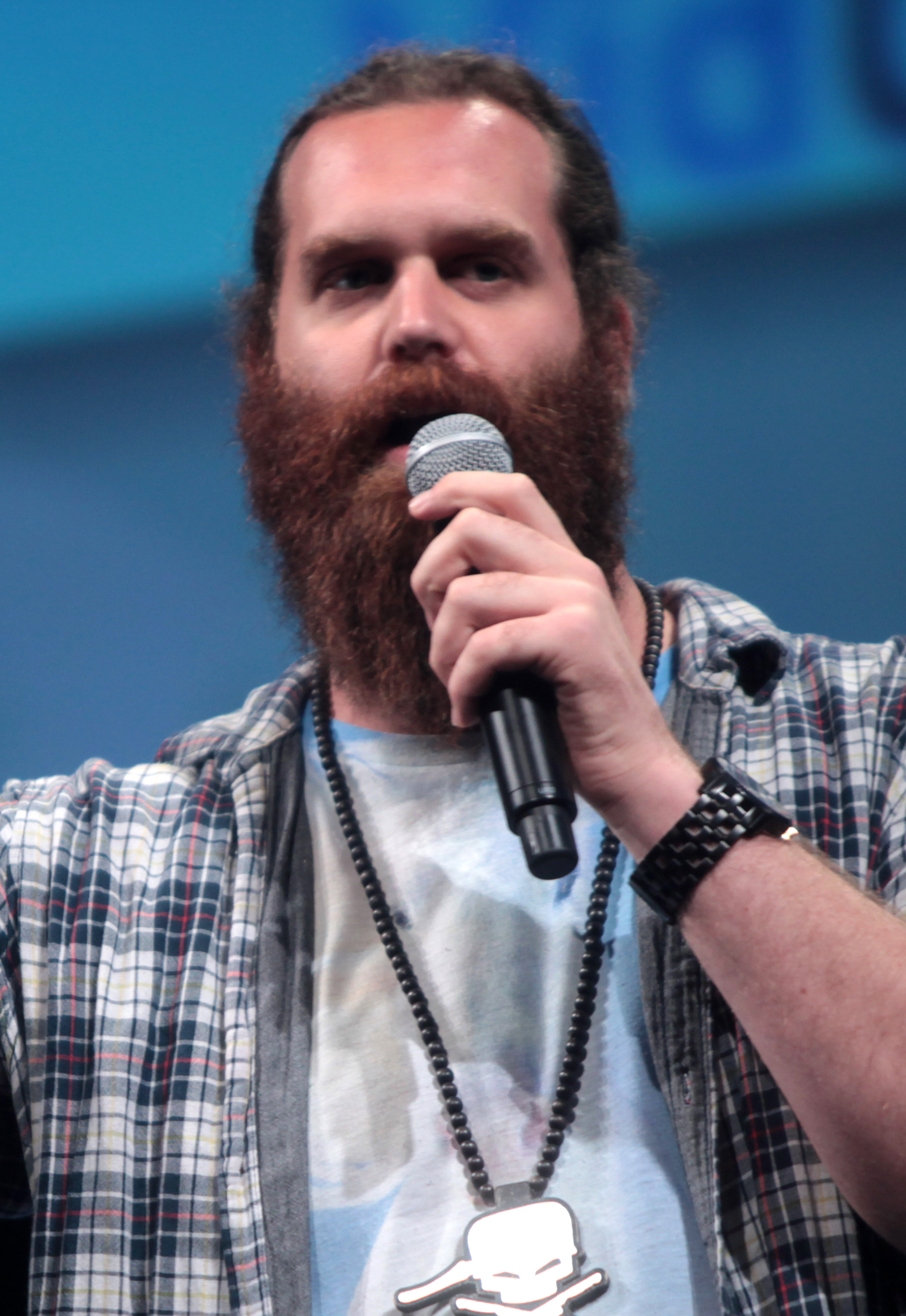
Harley Morenstein, winner of the Food and Cuisine category

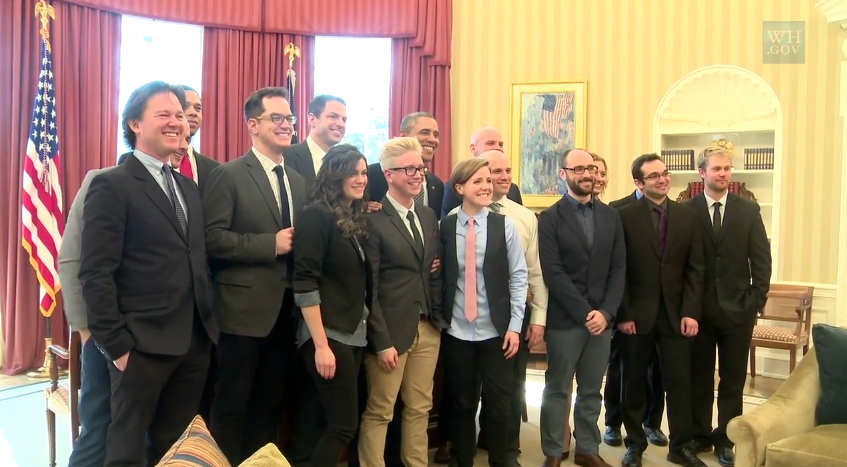
The Public Service award went to YouTube Stars Talk Health Care at the White House (external link)

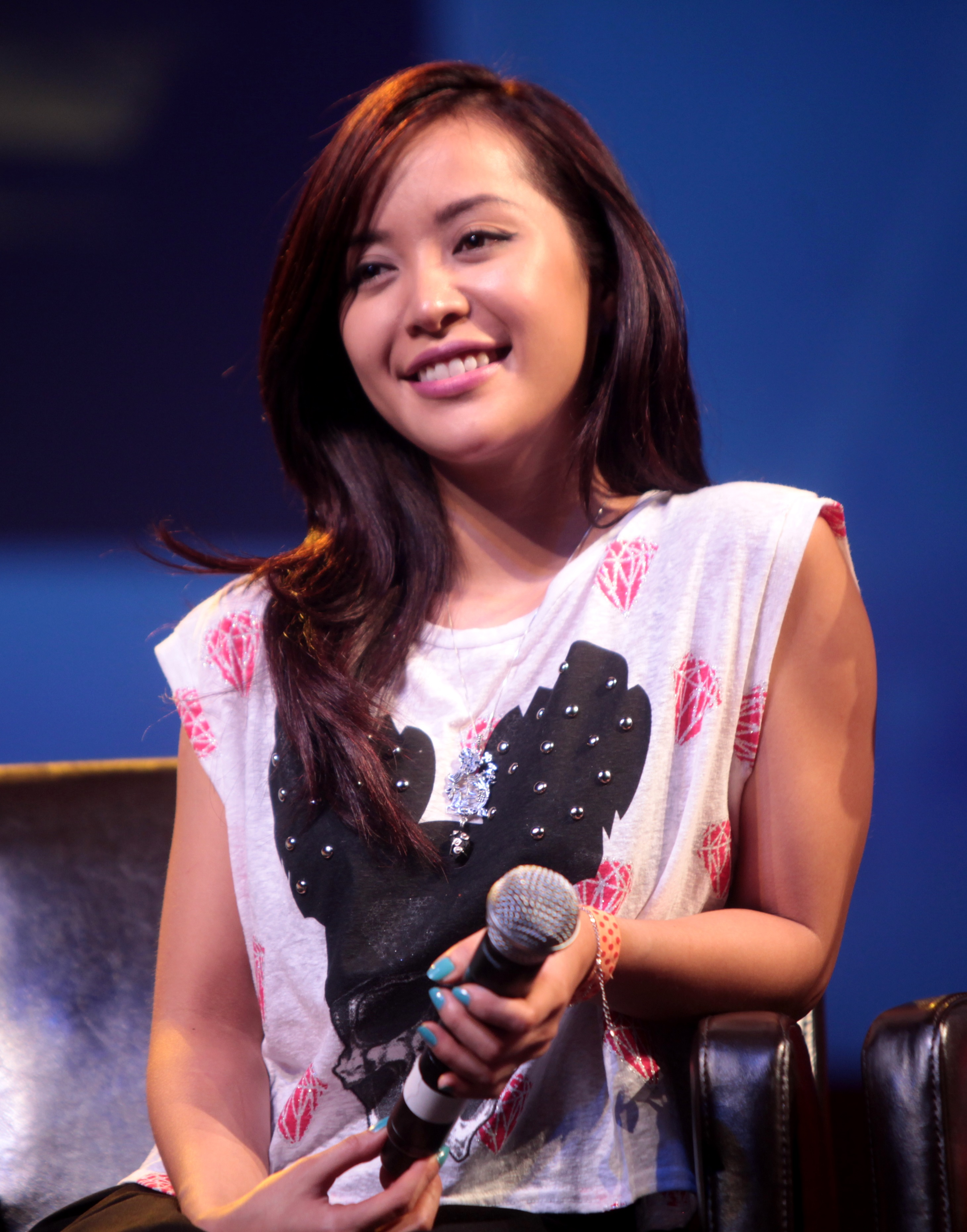
Michelle Phan won a Streamy Icon Award for her beauty content

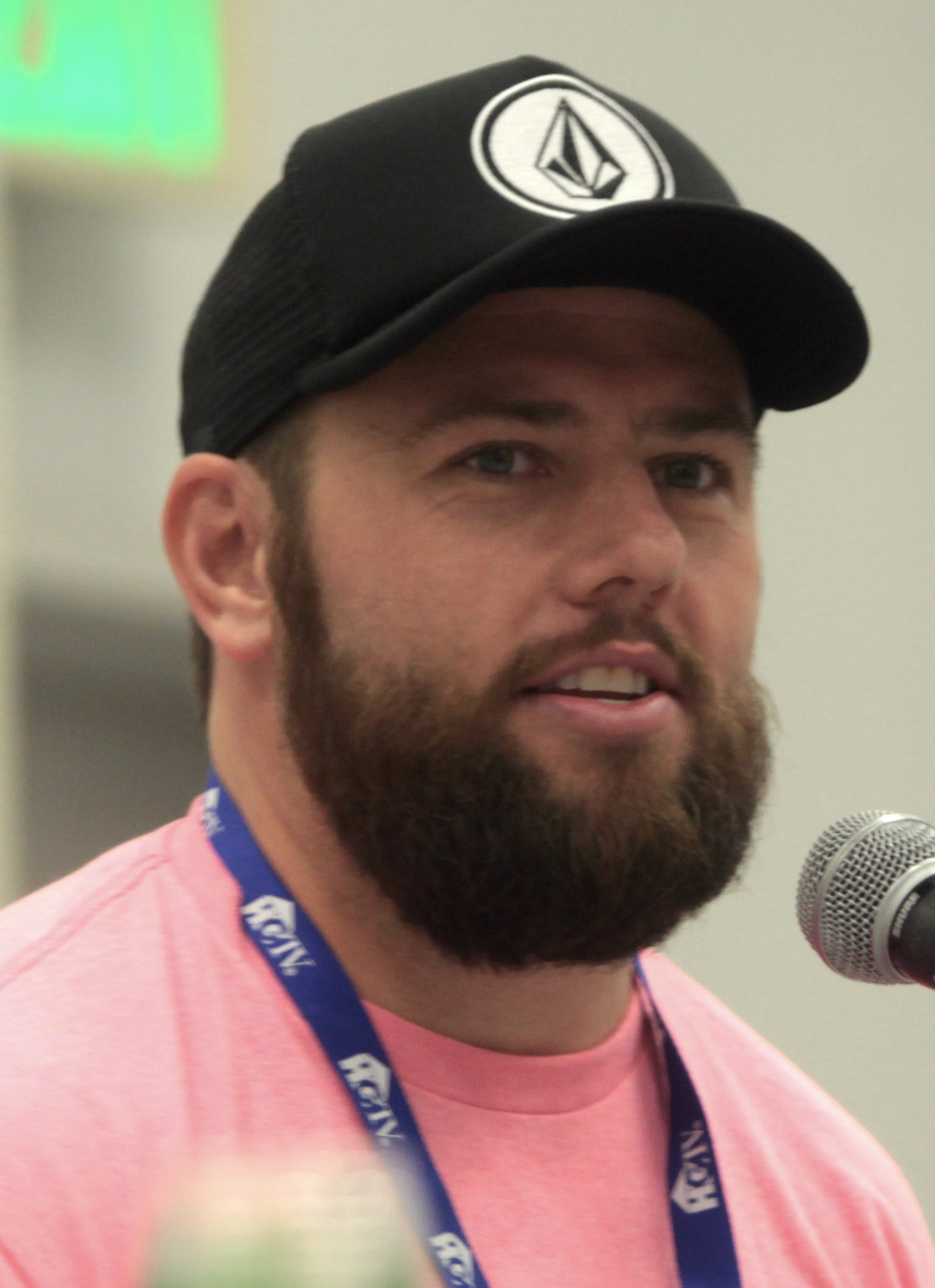
Shay Carl won a Streamy Icon Award for his YouTube channel SHAYTARDS and for work with Maker Studios

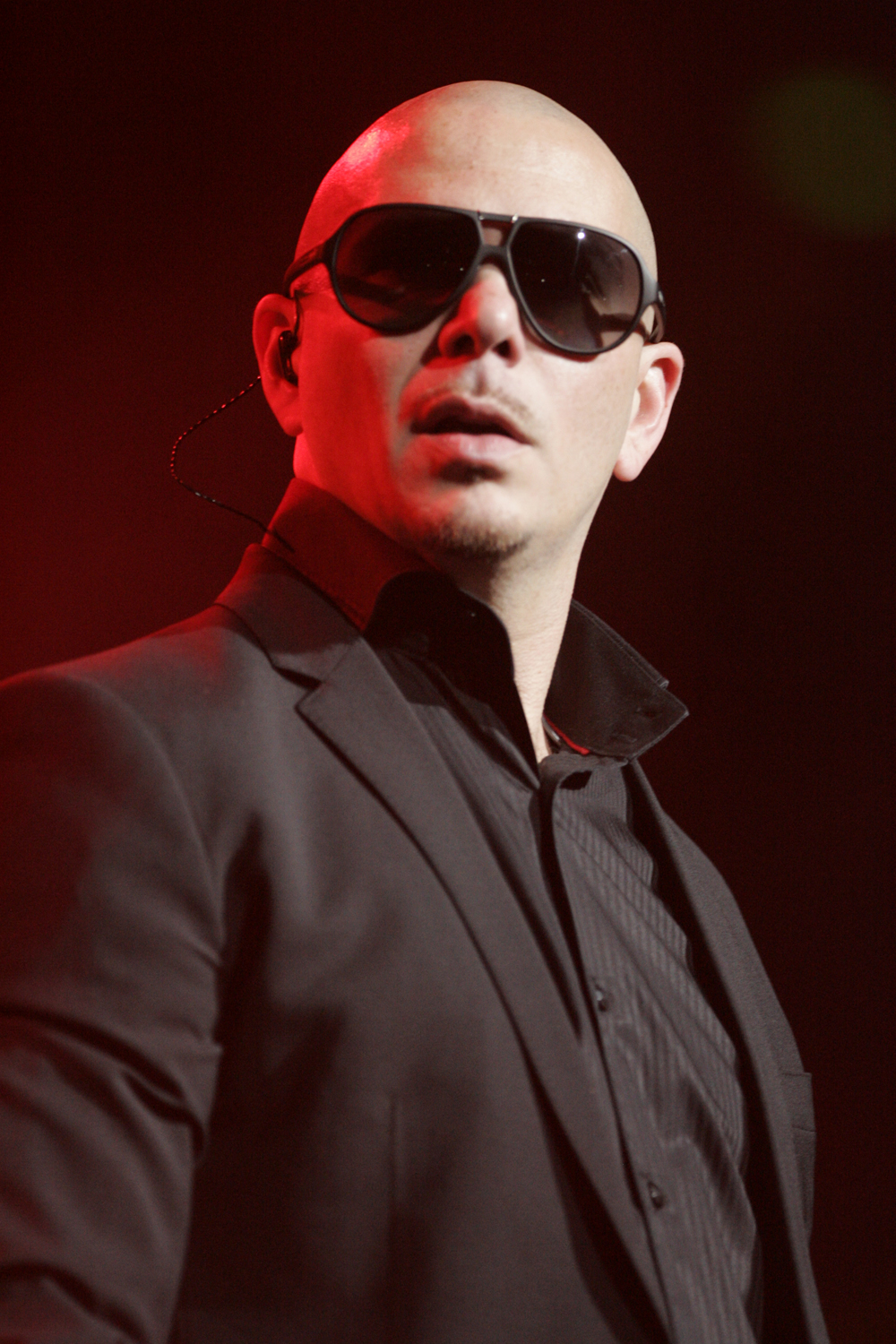
Pitbull won a Streamy Icon Award for embracing online media

The awards featured fan-voted submissions for the first time with the highest voted submission for each award category automatically being made one of the nominees. The nominees were announced on August 18, 2014 and the finalists for the Audience Choice Award categories were announced on August 27. 33 of the categories were announced on September 4 during the Official Streamys Nominee Reception at the YouTube Space LA. Four YouTubers were also presented with the first ever Streamy Icon Awards at a private dinner on September 5. The remaining 14 awards were announced during the main ceremony at The Beverly Hilton on September 7. Winners of the categories were selected by the Streamys Blue Ribbon Panel except for the Audience Choice awards which were put to a public vote.

Winners are listed first, in bold.

OVERALL
Audience Choice Award for Show of the Year	Audience Choice Award for Entertainer of the Year
**EnchufeTV**; Emma Approved; Kids React; MyMusic; Nerdy Nummies; Rooster Teeth; SortedFood; SourceFed; The Philip DeFranco Show; Video Game High School	**Tyler Oakley**; Bethany Mota; Brittany Furlan; Grace Helbig; Jack Vale; Jenna Marbles; Maiah Ocando; Michelle Phan; Ryan Higa; Toby Turner
Comedy	Companion
**My Drunk Kitchen**; Jenna Marbles; MyMusic; Ryan Higa; Smosh	**Vandaveon and Mike**; Almost Royal Goes To YouTube; Parks and Recreation in YouTube; Prairie Home Tailgating; Sesame Street
Drama	Non-Fiction or Reality
**The Lizzie Bennet Diaries**; Chosen; Lauren; Mortal Kombat: Legacy II; Storytellers	**Comedians in Cars Getting Coffee**; @SummerBreak; Our2ndLife; PBS Idea Channel; Shaytards
Television Show	
**Tonight Show Starring Jimmy Fallon**; @midnight; Conan; Jimmy Kimmel Live; Right This Minute	
VINE
Viner of the Year
**Brittany Furlan**; Cameron Dallas; King Bach; Lele Pons; Marcus Johns
Vine Comedian	Vine Creativity
**DeStorm Power**; Alphacat; Brittany Furlan; Jerome Jarre; Logan Paul	**Zach King**; Mashable; Meagan Cignoli; Regal Cinemas; yelldesign
SUBJECT AWARDS
Action and Sci-Fi	Beauty
**Video Game High School**; Action Movie Kid; Corridor Digital; Mortal Kombat: Legacy II; Red vs. Blue	**Missglamorazzi**; cutepolish; eleventhgorgeous; Kandee Johnson; Michelle Phan
Dance	Fashion
**Jabbawockeez**; Break’n Reality; Dance Showdown; Strictly Ballet; WHZGUD2	**Bethany Mota**; Intersection; Lauren Curtis; Maiah Ocando; Zoella
Food and Cuisine	Gaming
**Epic Meal Time**; Anthony Eats America; Nerdy Nummies; SortedFood; ThirstyFor	**Smosh Games**; PewDiePie; SourceFed Nerd; Stampylonghead; TableTop
Health and Wellness	Kids and Family
**Blogilates**; BroScienceLife; KaliMuscle; strengthcamp; Tony Horton Fitness	**Kids React**; Convos With My 2-Year-Old; Fatherhood; Kid President; Shaytards
News and Current Events	Pranks
**SourceFed**; Huffpost Live; Op-Docs; Retro Report; YouTube Nation	**Jack Vale**; FouseyTube; Prank it FWD; Roman Atwood; Stuart Edge
Science and Education	Sports
**Vsauce**; AsapSCIENCE; Good Mythical Morning; Mental Floss; The Slow Mo Guys	**Red Bull**; Devinsupertramp; Dude Perfect; 30 for 30 Shorts; My Ink
Animated	First Person
**RWBY**; 8-Bit Cinema; Blank on Blank; Bravest Warriors; Simon's Cat	**Jenna Marbles**; Grace Helbig; Justine Ezarik; Maiah Ocando; Tyler Oakley
Indie	International
**Little Horribles**; Bad Timing; Destroy the Alpha Gammas; Sad Motivator; The Platoon of Power Squadron	**Noob**; AlaaWardi; EnchufeTV; Galo Frito; Neymar Jr: Life Outside the Fields
PERFORMANCE
Actress in a Comedy	Actress in a Drama
**Mamrie Hart**; Johanna Braddy; Brittany Furlan; Charlotte Newhouse; Joanna Sotomura	**Ashley Clements**; Troian Bellisario; Kate Conway; Francesca Eastwood; Julia Stiles
Actor in a Comedy	Actor in a Drama
**David Milchard**; Brent Bailey; Greg Davis Jr. aka Klarity; Paul Scheer; Jimmy Wong	**Joey Graceffa**; David Arquette; Wilson Cleveland; Brian Tee; Daniel Vincent Gordh
Collaboration	Ensemble Cast
**Zach Galifianakis and President Barack Obama**; Flula Borg and Chester See; Harley Morenstein and Arnold Schwarzenegger; Nice Peter, EpicLLOYD, and Snoop Dogg; Rooster Teeth, Freddie Wong, iJustine, Greg Miller, and Adam Kovic	**Video Game High School**; ArScheerio Paul; MyMusic; Next Time On Lonny; Annoying Orange
MUSIC
Cover Song	Music Video
**Pentatonix, "Daft Punk Mashup" (Daft Punk)**; Andy Lange, Chester See, Andrew Garcia, and Josh Golden, "Roar" (Katy Perry); Madilyn Bailey, "Wake Me Up" (Avicii); Pomplamoose, "Happy"/"Get Lucky" Mashup (Pharrell Williams); Postmodern Jukebox, "Timber" (Pitbull ft. Ke$ha)	**"Goku vs. Superman", Epic Rap Battles of History**; "#SELFIE", The Chainsmokers; "Cookie Dance", Chip Chocolate; "Finish What We Started", Miles Fisher; "Odds Are", Barenaked Ladies
Musical Artist	Original Song
**Lindsey Stirling**; Boyce Avenue; Chester See; Cimorelli; Pentatonix	**"Whistle While I Work It", Chester See**; "#LEH", IISuperwomanII and Humble The Poet; "Airplanes and Terminals", Timothy DeLaGhetto; "Love Again", Pentatonix; "Never Wanna Let You Go", Megan Nicole
CRAFT AWARDS
Choreography	Cinematography
**Mortal Kombat: Legacy II**, **Garrett Warren and Larnell Stovall**; Castrol Footkhana: Neymar Jr. v Ken Block, Andy Ansah, Brian Scotto, Neymar Jr., and Ken Block; Dance Showdown, Ambrose Respicio and Anze Skrube; Jabbawockeez Presents Regenerate, Jabbawockeez; Super Power Beat Down, Alvin J. Hsing, Peter Jang, and Shaun Paul Piccinino	Devinsupertramp, Devin Graham'; @SummerBreak, Joseph Guidry; Mortal Kombat: Legacy II, Scott Keven; Making A Scene, Bartosz Nalazek; Rocket Jump, Lauren Haroutunian and Jon Salmon
Costume Design	Directing
**Epic Rap Battles of History, Sulai Lopez**; Bart Baker, Morgan Christensen and Amanda Hosler; Fallout: Nuka Break, Katie Broad, Kai Norman, and Mark Zoran; Video Game High School, Layne McGovern; YouTube Rewind, Annie Rothschild	**Video Game High School, Matt Arnold and Freddie Wong**; BlackBoxTV Presents, Tony E. Valenzuela; Eric Wareheim, Eric Wareheim; Lauren, Jon Avnet; Mortal Kombat: Legacy II, Kevin Tancharoen
Editing	Original Score
**Kids React, Dan Seibert, Justin Reager, Benny Fine, Rafi Fine, and Jordan Towles**; Epic Rap Battles of History, Andrew Sherman, Ryan Moulton, Daniel Turcan, and Nice Peter; MysteryGuitarMan, Joe Penna and Ryan Morrison; Rocket Jump, Desmond Dolly, Ben Waller, and Freddie Wong; Annoying Orange, Dane Boedigheimer, Aaron Massey, Spencer Grove, and Matt Sklar	**RWBY, Jeff Williams**; Caper, Joe LoDuca; Continuum, Damon Criswell; Next Time On Lonny, Leo Birenberg; Red Scare, Giona Ostinelli
Visual and Special Effects	Writing
**Action Movie Kid, Daniel Hashimoto**; Corridor Digital, Niko Pueringer and Sam Gorski; Mortal Kombat: Legacy II, Lars Anderson, John Myers, and Jerry Spivack; Rocket Jump, Freddie Wong; Video Game High School, Chris Bailey and Joseph Cornell	**Epic Rap Battles of History, Nice Peter, EpicLLOYD, Zach Sherwin, Dante Cimadamore, and Mike Betette**; Barely Political, Mark Douglas and Todd Womack; Husbands, Brad Bell and Jane Espenson; Kid President, Brad Montague and Robby Novak; Red vs. Blue, Burnie Burns and Miles Luna
CAMPAIGN OR EVENT
Brand Campaign	Live Event
**Need For Speed: Ken Block's Gymkhana Six** **(Need for Speed)**; Backseat Italians (Fiat); Dear Kitten (Purina Friskies); Sloth Week (Animalist)	**#Tubeathon 2013**; Comedy Gives Back 2013; DigiFest NYC 2014; Doctor Who 50th Anniversary Live; Steve Aoki: Live at the Shrine
Public Service	
**YouTube Stars Talk Health Care at the White House**; International Day of Happiness; Rooster Teeth 24 Hr Extra Life Fundraiser; Sport Relief 2014; Star Wars: Force for Change	

Streamy Icon Awards

- **"Activism" ICON Award** – **Tyler Oakley**
- **"Convergence" ICON Award** – **Pitbull**
- **"Entrepreneurship" ICON Award** – **Shay Carl**
- **"Inspiration" ICON Award** – **Michelle Phan**

=== Web series with multiple nominations and awards ===
Web series that received multiple nominations
Nominations	Web Series
6	Mortal Kombat: Legacy II
6	Video Game High School
4	Epic Rap Battles of History
3	Kids React
3	MyMusic
3	Rocket Jump
3	Rooster Teeth
3	SourceFed
2	Action Movie Kid
2	Annoying Orange
2	Corridor Digital
2	Dance Showdown
2	Devinsupertramp
2	EnchufeTV
2	Kid President
2	Lauren
2	Nerdy Nummies
2	Next Time On Lonny
2	Red vs. Blue
2	RWBY
2	Shaytards
2	Smosh
2	SortedFood
2	@SummerBreak

Web series that received multiple awards
Awards	Web series
3	Epic Rap Battles of History
3	Video Game High School
2	Kids React
2	RWBY

== Reception ==
Rae Votta of The Daily Dot felt that 4th Streamy Awards were more polished than previous years, providing the show with a greater sense of legitimacy. Similarly, Liz Shannon Miller writing for IndieWire stated that the show felt professional. She also felt that "the most entertaining moments were off-the-cuff, organic and honest, including irreverently name-checking the sponsors and ignoring the teleprompter." Evan DeSimone of NewMediaRockstars said of the show "As usual, the night featured a bunch of hilarious off-script moments and a few technical mishaps but nothing could derail the excitement of online video's biggest night."

Votta as well as Mikey Glazer writing for TheWrap singled out Mamrie Hart's toast in dedication of Joan Rivers for praise with Votta describing it as "the evening's most somber moment" and Glazer describing it as "an authentic and intimate salute" and a high point of the night. Votta and Glazer also both positively viewed the ending performance of the night by Starship. Michael Andor Brodeur of The Boston Globe praised Grace Helbig and Hannah Hart in their role as hosts of the show, saying that they "did charmingly ironic impressions of award-show hosts, peppering their opening routine with product placements, feigning a musical number, and hacking the usual crowd roasting".

Katie Buenneke, writing for the LA Weekly, criticized the amount of corporate influence on the show, contrasting the nature of YouTube as a platform for independent content creators with the "multiple shout-outs to Coca-Cola, conspicuous integration of Samsung phones, and, most insidiously, the influence of producers like Endemol, Maker Studio and Fullscreen" at the show. However, she also noted "the night was filled with a sense of excitement about being part of a new way of connecting with audiences."

The show received a high level of social media engagement compared to leading non-sports televised shows such as Big Brother and Utopia, according to data from Nielsen and Sysomos.

== See also ==
- List of Streamy Award winners
