= María Thelma Smáradóttir =

Icelandic stage and film actress (born 1993)

- Born: 22 January 1993 (age 32); Iceland
- Education: Iceland Academy of the Arts
- Occupation: Actress

María Thelma Smáradóttir (born 22 January 1993) is an Icelandic stage and film actress. She is known for her roles in the TV-series Prisoners and Trapped and in the 2018 survival drama film Arctic alongside Mads Mikkelsen.

== Career ==
María graduated from the Iceland Academy of the Arts in 2016. Shortly later, she appeared in the TV Mini-Series Prisoners. In 2018, she appeared alongside Mads Mikkelsen in the film Arctic directed by Joe Penna.

In 2019, María premiered her theater play named Welcome home in the National Theatre of Iceland, telling her story and the story of her mother, who moved from Thailand to Iceland. In 2023, she appeared as Snæfríður Íslandssól in the stage adaption of Iceland's Bell.

== Filmography ==
- Svartur á leik (2012)
- Arctic (2018)

== Television ==
- Prisoners (2017)
- Who killed Friðrik Dór (2021)
- Trapped (2021)
- Afturelding (2023)

== Theater ==
- Ég get (2017)
- Risaeðlurnar (2017)
- Welcome home (2019)
- Iceland's Bell (2023)
