= Maiah Ocando =

Venezuelan actress

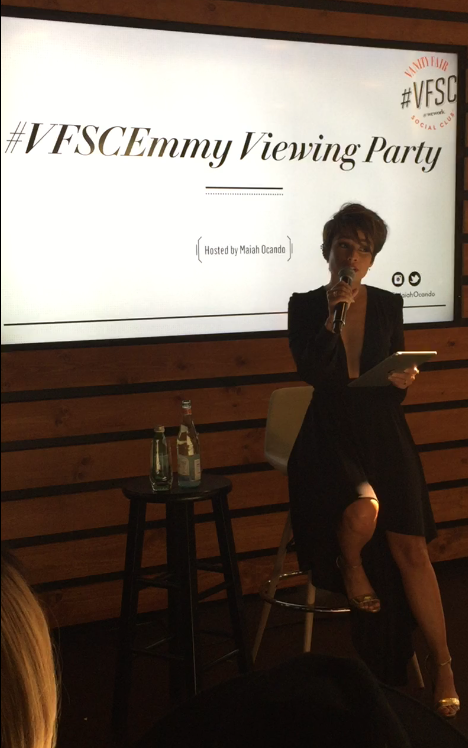
- Ocando hosting Vanity Fair's official viewing party and Tweet Up for the Emmys 2015
- Occupations: Entertainer, author, fashion designer, actress, internet personality

YouTube information
- Channel: Maiah Ocando
- Years active: 2011–present
- Genres: Comedy; fashion; beauty
- Subscribers: 812,000
- Views: 40 million
- Last updated: 4 August 2026

Maiah Ocando is a Venezuelan actress and Internet personality now living in Los Angeles, California. She studied Fashion Design at the Brivil Institute and Filmmaking at the School of Cinema and Television in Caracas. She is the host of the YouTube webshow Visto Bueno and writer of the book series of the same name. She co-created and hosted the online series She Looks Like, hosted "Holiday House" and was featured as a co-host on the TV and online series Vive El Verano for NBC Universo.

In 2014 Ocando signed a talent development deal with Disney-ABC for artist's services as a host for a future television show.

== Early work ==
In 2011, Ocando contributed as a stylist for the world's first online sci-fi series filmed entirely using only mobile phones. The project, titled Planeta N8, was one of three finalists in the P&M Awards 2012, and was developed for the Nokia N8 advertising campaign.

Ocando's first webshow was Umoda TV, covering emerging fashion designers, makeup artists, photographers and supermodels for the region. The series was featured on Planetaurbe TV, the first online TV network for youngsters in Latin America.

Before that, Ocando was a singer, who released a rock-pop album in 2005 titled A través de mis ojos ("Through my eyes"). The album contained ten songs, for which Ocando was the vocalist.

== Visto Bueno and other projects ==
Ocando's Visto Bueno series was nominated for two Streamy Awards 2013 as Best International Series and Series of the Year; in 2014 in Fashion, First Person and Entertainer of the Year categories; and again in 2015 in Fashion. She was the first Latina to be nominated three years in a row, and hers was the only Spanish-speaking show nominated.

Ocando's content was featured on a regular basis on AOL, Huffpost video, and the Uvideos platform. The Venezuelan website La Patilla and the Venezuelan TV channel Globovision also featured her work.

In 2014, Ocando landed a talent deal with ABC and moved to LA to continue working on her projects. She also signed a deal the same year to take part in the digital show Gentlemen's Code alongside the rapper Pitbull, accompanied by Shira Lazar, Brittany Furlan, Simone Sheperd and Kandee Johnson. In September 2015, Ocando signed an endorsement deal with Ford Motors U.S. It was also announced that NBC Universo had teamed up with several Latino social media stars to launch the series Vive el Verano, which has Ocando amongst its stars.

For the 2015 Streamy Awards, Ocando was chosen by VH1 to be their promotional image. She also hosted Vanity Fair's official viewing party and Tweet Up for the Emmys in 2015.

In July 2016, Ocando signed a content development deal with Univision. As part of the deal, Ocando and her partner, writer/producer, Gabriel Torrelles, created and starred a portfolio of new series on beauty, fitness, relationships, fashion and DIY projects aimed at multicultural millennial women in America, as well as serve as their digital correspondent, creating social content and formats for platforms such as Snapchat and Facebook Live. In September 2016, Ocando joined the team of Noticias Univision #EdicionDigital.

In December 2016 Dear Maiah, a digital series starring Ocando, premiered. It was developed in collaboration with Fullscreen's AT&T Hello Lab, with Ocando serving also as executive producer and creative consultant for the series. A digital spin on an advice column, Dear Maiah encouraged Ocando's fans to ask her questions relating about everyday life. The show received nearly 3.3 million total video views, and was a finalist for "Best Use Of Instagram" and "Mobile Campaign" at the 9th Annual Shorty Awards in March 2017.

In the spring of 2017, Ocando and Torrelles created a podcast called No sé, dime tú (I don't know, you tell me) which comments on pop culture, current events and their lives as immigrants fighting for the American dream in Los Angeles. The podcast was named one of the "9 Latinx Podcasts You Should Be Listening To Right Now" by Latina Magazine.

== Books ==
In 2013 Ocando signed a deal with Editorial Cadena Capriles and launched a collection of six books based on the Visto Bueno series. The collection sold out in six weeks. The digital version of the series reached #1 on Amazon in US, Spain and Mexico, and stayed on the best seller list for several weeks.

== Personal life ==
Ocando is in a longtime relationship with writer and producer Gabriel Torrelles, whom she started dating in 2005 and married in 2014 in Los Angeles, and who is the co-creator and producer of Visto Bueno.

== Awards and nominations ==
Year	Nominated	Award	Result
2013	Streamy Awards	2013 Best International Series	Nominated
2013	Streamy Awards	2013 Audience Choice Finalists for Series of the Year	Nominated
2014	Streamy Awards	2014 First Person	Nominated
2014	Streamy Awards	2014 Entertainer of the Year	Nominated
2014	Streamy Awards	2014 Streamy Award: Fashion	Nominated
2015	Streamy Awards	2015 Streamy Award: Fashion	Nominated
2017	Shorty Awards	9th Annual Shorty Awards: Best Mobile Campaign	Nominated
2017	Shorty Awards	9th Annual Shorty Awards: Best Use Of Instagram	Nominated
