= Vilhelm Neto =

Icelandic-Portuguese actor (born 1993)

- Born: 25 June 1993 (age 33); Reykjavík, Iceland
- Other name: Villi Neto
- Education: CISPA
- Occupations: Actor, comedian
- Years active: 2010–
- Known for: Áramótaskaupið, Hver Drap Friðrik Dór?

Vilhelm Þór Da Silva Neto (born 25 June 1993) is an Icelandic-Portuguese actor and comedian. He is known for his appearances in Áramótaskaupið and Hver Drap Friðrik Dór? He graduated from Copenhagen International School of Performing Arts in 2019.

== Early life ==
Vilhelm was born in Reykjavík, Iceland, to an Icelandic mother and a Portuguese father. He moved at a young age with his family to Figueira da Foz in Portugal. He moved back to Iceland in 2007 and in 2010 he appeared in the Icelandic drama film Órói. In 2018, he became known for his comedy sketches on Twitter. In 2019, he appeared in the Áramótaskaupið, an annual Icelandic television comedy special that is broadcast on RÚV on 31 December. In 2021, he played the main part in the comedy mini-series Hver Drap Friðrik Dór? and in August the same year, he was hired as one of the writers of the 2021 Áramótaskaupið.
