= Sarah Penna =

Sarah Penna is the co-founder of Big Frame, a YouTube Multi Channel Network. Before starting Big Frame, Penna was Phillip DeFranco's manager. According to Forbes, Penna was "one of the first people ever hired to manage a YouTube career."

== Personal life ==
Sarah has been married to Joe Penna (also known as MysteryGuitarMan) since 2011.

On February 19, 2014, both Sarah and Joe Penna announced on Twitter that Sarah is pregnant with their first child.

On September 3, 2014, Sarah gave birth to her and Joe Penna's first child, a boy named Jonah Lane Penna.
