= Urbe Bikini =

Venezuelan men's magazine

- Editor: Eric Colón
- Categories: Men's magazine
- Founder: Gabriel Torrelles
- Founded: 2003
- Company: Iguana Blue Networks
- Country: Venezuela
- Based in: Caracas, Venezuela
- Website: www.ubthemagazine.com

Urbe Bikini (UB) is a Venezuelan, Maxim-styled monthly men's magazine with original photographs of famous models and editorial content geared to men 25 to 40. From its launch in December 2003, Urbe Bikini has become the largest circulation glossy in the country. The magazine was published by the same company that in 1995 had launched Venezuela's first alternative weekly, Urbe.

== History ==
Urbe Bikini was created by Urbe's editor-in-chief and creative director, Gabriel Torrelles, along with country's largest publisher, Cadena Capriles.

Venezuelan model and influencer Yei Love has a popular column discussing sexual issues in Urbe Bikini.

== Impact and style ==
The creative visual input and influence of advertising and fashion photographer Jorge Parra, who produced and photographed all editorial content for the first five editions of Urbe Bikini, has helped the success of the magazine, and created opportunities and inspiration for young photographers in Venezuela.

More recently, the magazine has gone more towards boudoir-soft porn kind of imagery, which has led to still higher record sales for editorial publications in Venezuela.
