= Hver Drap Friðrik Dór? =

2021 Icelandic comedy TV series

- Genre: Comedy
- Directed by: Haukur Björgvinsson; Eilífur Örn; Helgi Jóhannsson; Hörður Sveinsson
- Starring: Vilhelm Neto; María Thelma Smáradóttir; Guðrún Gísladóttir; Benedikt Erlingsson; María Ellingsen; Ragnar Ísleifur Bragason
- Country of origin: Iceland
- Original language: Icelandic
- No. of seasons: 1
- No. of episodes: 5

Production
- Executive producers: Ólafur Páll Torfason; Þórunn Guðlaugsdóttir
- Producer: Ólafur Páll Torfason
- Cinematography: Gunnar Auðunn Jóhannsson
- Production company: Snark

Original release
- Network: Sjónvarp Símans
- Release: 25 February – 25 March 2021

Who Killed Friðrik Dór? (Icelandic: Hver Drap Friðrik Dór?) is an Icelandic television comedy series, shot in a mockumentary style, developed by Snark. It is a five-part series about Vilhelm Neto, who's uncovering the conspiracy behind the alleged killing of one of Iceland's most beloved pop stars, Friðrik Dór.

It premiered in Sjónvarp Símans the 25th of February, 2021.
