= Arctic (film) =

- Theatrical release poster
- Directed by: Joe Penna
- Written by: Joe Penna; Ryan Morrison
- Produced by: Chris Lemole; Tim Zajaros; Noah C. Haeussner
- Starring: Mads Mikkelsen; María Thelma Smáradóttir
- Cinematography: Tómas Örn Tómasson
- Edited by: Ryan Morrison
- Music by: Joseph Trapanese
- Production companies: Armory Films; Union Entertainment Group; Pegasus Pictures
- Distributed by: Bleecker Street (United States); Sam Film (Iceland)
- Release dates: 10 May 2018 (Cannes); 1 February 2019 (United States)
- Running time: 97 minutes
- Countries: Iceland; United States
- Languages: English; Danish; Icelandic
- Box office: $4.1 million

Arctic is a 2018 survival drama film directed by Joe Penna and written by Penna and Ryan Morrison. The film is an international co-production between Iceland and the United States, and stars Mads Mikkelsen as a man stranded in the Arctic. The film premiered at the 2018 Cannes Film Festival, and was released in theatres on 1 February 2019.

== Plot ==
Overgård is stranded in the Arctic Circle waiting for rescue, living in his crashed plane. His daily routine consists of checking fishing lines, mapping his surroundings and running a distress beacon powered by a hand-crank dynamo. One day, his supply of fish is raided by a polar bear. A helicopter responds to his beacon and attempts to land, but crashes. The pilot is killed in the accident and the passenger is severely injured and unconscious. Overgård dresses her wound and takes her to his plane. She does not speak English and only proves her alertness by squeezing his hand.

Overgård returns to the wreckage of the downed helicopter and finds some food, a propane cooking stove, medical equipment, a sled, a map of the area, and a photo of the woman, the pilot and their child, which he brings back for her. On the map, he locates a seasonal refuge that appears to be a few days' trek away. When the woman's condition does not improve, he decides he must risk the journey to the refuge to seek rescue, by a direct route. He secures the woman to the sledge and drags her behind him. He runs into a steep slope not indicated on the map, climbs it alone and sees a relatively smooth path in front of him, but fails three times in trying to hoist the woman up using ropes. He therefore decides he must take the longer route, around the icy outcrops, aware that this detour will add days to his sledge-hauling trek. The flat path is exposed to strong headwinds.

When they take refuge one night in a cave, a polar bear is attracted to the scent of cooking fish. He drives the bear off with a distress flare. The next day, the woman's condition worsens. Assuming her to be dead or near death, he abandons her to continue his journey alone but leaves her with the photo of her family. Shortly afterwards, he falls in a crevasse and is knocked unconscious. He awakens to find himself at the bottom of a cavern with one of his legs trapped under a boulder. He injures it in repeated efforts to tug it free, and finally manages to crawl out of the cavern and back to the surface. Returning to the woman's sled, he finds that she is still alive, weeps in apology, and, despite his injured leg, sets his mind to taking her with him again.

Nearing exhaustion, Overgård climbs a small hill and sees a helicopter landing in the distance. Using the last of his strength, he pushes the sledge to the top of the hill and lights his remaining flare, screaming out, "here, we're here!". Seeing no response from the two men from the helicopter crew, he sets his parka on fire with the flare, waving it above his head. The helicopter takes off and flies away in the opposite direction disappearing behind a mountain. Exhausted, he reassures the woman, taking her hand in his and lies down next to her. As he closes his eyes, the helicopter lands behind them.

== Cast ==
- Mads Mikkelsen as Overgård - Stranded pilot
- María Thelma Smáradóttir as Young Woman
- Tintrinai Thikhasuk as Helicopter Pilot

== Production ==
The film was shot over the course of 19 days in Iceland. Mads Mikkelsen referred to the film as the most difficult shoot of his career.

== Release ==
On 12 April 2018, the film was selected to compete for the Camera d'Or at the 2018 Cannes Film Festival. Bleecker Street acquired U.S. and selected international rights out of the Cannes Film Festival.

On 1 February 2023, the film was released on Netflix US and quickly reached the top spot for most-watched movies of the week.

== Reception ==
As of October 2021, the film holds a 90% approval rating on review aggregator Rotten Tomatoes, based on 150 reviews with an average rating of 7.1/10. The website's critical consensus reads, "Arctic proves that a good survival thriller doesn't need much in the way of dialogue to get by – especially when Mads Mikkelsen is the one doing the surviving." On Metacritic, the film has a weighted average score of 71 out of 100, based on 30 critics, indicating "generally favorable reviews".

Nick Allen of RogerEbert.com gave the film 2.5 stars out of 4, saying that the drama "largely subsists on the on-screen muscle of Mads Mikkelsen." Oliver Jones of The New York Observer gave the film 3.5/4 stars, calling it "precise, honest and unrelenting." He added that the film "is one of those singular cinematic experiences ... for which movie theaters still exist." David Ehrlich of Indiewire called it "one of the best movies ever made about a man stranded in the wilderness", adding that "Mads Mikkelsen doesn't need any dialogue to deliver the best performance of his career."

== See also ==
- List of Icelandic films
