= Gabriel Torrelles =

Venezuelan writer

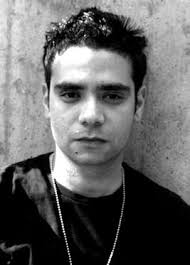
- Born: September 14, 1978 (age 47); Caracas, Venezuela
- Occupations: Writer, producer and entrepreneur
- Spouse: Maiah Ocando
- Writing career
- Genres: Drama, Comedy, Satire
- Literary movement: Postmodern

Gabriel Torrelles is a writer, filmmaker, and Internet entrepreneur from Caracas, Venezuela. He was editor in chief of Urbe, a newspaper first published in 1996 with the aim of being an alternative newspaper for Venezuelan youth. This was the first youth newspaper of Venezuela. He also co-founded Planetaurbe.tv, and the magazine Urbe Bikini, along with the country's largest publisher, Cadena Capriles.

== Literary work ==
Torrelles wrote the novel Worse than you (Peor que tú, 2008), which was a bestseller for youngsters in his country.

In 2007 Torrelles was recognized at the Young Readers Contest 2007 in the Brand Category (Innovative Activities to Improve the Relationship Between the Newspaper and Youth), organized by the World Association of Newspapers, a nonprofit organization that brings together 18,000 publications on five continents. The award was due to his role as Creative Director and Executive Producer of the Urbe Awards 2006 and the campaign "Have you ever seen a green dog".

In March 2008, Torrelles was one of the fifteen writers selected to participate as a speaker in the III New Urban Narrative Week with his short story "Todas las mentiras que recuerdo", which was selected among 110 stories received from eight countries. The story was published in the anthology Tiempos de Ciudad (2010) edited by Fundación Para La Cultura Urbana.

== Internet and innovation ==
In recent years, Torrelles has been involved in narrative projects combining storytelling and Internet. One of the highlights has been creating and writing the eight-episode miniseries Planeta N8, released in September 2011 and sponsored by Nokia. This is the world's first television series made entirely with cell phones.

The series was part of Planetaurbe.tv's content, an online TV channel for youngsters throughout Latin America. Torrelles was founder and CEO of Planetaurbe.tv until mid-2012. Planetaurbe.tv was an alternative weekly aimed to a young audience for 15 years, but under Torrelles' direction decided to use digital tools and become an online and interactive TV channel in partnership with Venezuela's largest media outlet, Cadena Capriles. Torrelles claimed that his dream was to make a different television, not only in terms of quality, but also according to the Internet's way of thinking.

In September 2012 Torrelles won a Silver Trophy Anda Award in the Non-profit Message-Digital Campaign category as Creative Director and Director for "What if you could do it again?" (Tú sí puedes), a video about unwanted teenage pregnancy.

Since 2012 Torrelles has been the executive producer and creative director of an online comedy and how-to-and-syle TV series called Visto Bueno. The show has been described as "lifehacking for the style-conscious consumer" and an effort to create a space for young girls to discuss fashion and beauty advice for any size, on any budget.

In 2013 Torrelles created She Looks Like, a series that attempts to crack the look of celebrities using visuals and comedy. A second season was ordered for spring 2014.

In 2014 Torrelles and his creative partner Maiah Ocando landed a talent development deal with Disney-ABC for a future television show.

Visto Buenowas nominated for two Streamy Awards 2013 as Best International Series and Series of the Year, in 2014 in Fashion, First Person and Entertainer of the Year categories, and again in 2015 in Fashion. This was the first Latin show to be nominated three years in a row, and the only Spanish-speaking show nominated.

Torrelles was the executive producer of Vuelo sobre ti, an independent feature documentary about the last tour of the Venezuelan rock band Zapato 3. The film had a distribution deal with Amazonia Films to be premiered in October 2015 in 40 movie theaters in Venezuela, the biggest release for a music film in the country. In September 2016, Vuelo sobre ti won the award for Best Documentary Feature in the ELCO Film Festival 2016.

In July 2016, Maiah Ocando signed a Content Development Deal with Univision. As part of the deal, Torrelles created a portfolio of new series on beauty, fitness, relationships, fashion and DIY projects aimed at multicultural millennial women in America, starring Ocando, who served as their digital correspondent, creating innovative social content and formats for platforms such as Snapchat and Facebook Live. In September 2016, Ocando joined the team of Noticias Univision #EdicionDigital, the first network newscast conceived, designed and produced for live simulcast on digital/social platforms plus broadcast television, and the only noon network newscast in the United States. Torrelles was writer/executive producer of her segment.

In December 2016 Dear Maiah, a digital series starring Ocando, premiered. It was developed in collaboration with Fullscreen's AT&T Hello Lab, with Torrelles serving as executive producer and creative consultant for the series. A digital spin on an advice column, Dear Maiah encouraged Maiah's fans to ask her questions about everyday life. The show received nearly 3.3 million total video views, and was a finalist for the "Best Use of Instagram" and "Mobile Campaign" at the 9th Annual Shorty Awards in March 2017.

In the spring of 2017, Ocando and Torrelles created the podcast No sé, dime tú (I don't know, you tell me), which comments on pop culture, current events and their lives as immigrants searching for the American dream in Los Angeles. It was named one of the "9 Latinx Podcast You Should Be Listening To Right Now" by Latina Magazine.

== Bibliography ==
| Year | Title | Genre |
|---|---|---|
| 2008 | Peor que tú | Novel |
| 2008 | Sexo a 62 manos | Short stories |
| 2010 | Tiempos de ciudad | Short stories |

== Awards and nominations ==
| Year | Nominated | Award | Result |
|---|---|---|---|
| 2007 | World Young Reader Prize | Brand: Innovative Activities to Improve the Relationship Between the Newspaper and Youth | Won |
| 2012 | Anda Award | Silver Trophy: Non-profit Message-Digital Campaign | Won |
| 2013 | Streamy Awards | 2013 Best International Series | Nominated |
| 2013 | Streamy Awards | 2013 Audience Choice Finalists for Series of the Year | Nominated |
| 2014 | Streamy Awards | 2014 First Person | Nominated |
| 2014 | Streamy Awards | 2014 Entertainer of the Year | Nominated |
| 2014 | Streamy Awards | 2014 Streamy Award: Fashion | Nominated |
| 2015 | Streamy Awards | 2015 Streamy Award: Fashion | Nominated |
| 2017 | Shorty Awards | 9th Annual Shorty Awards: Best Mobile Campaign | Nominated |
| 2017 | Shorty Awards | 9th Annual Shorty Awards: Best Use Of Instagram | Nominated |
