= Kid President =

American actor (born 2003)

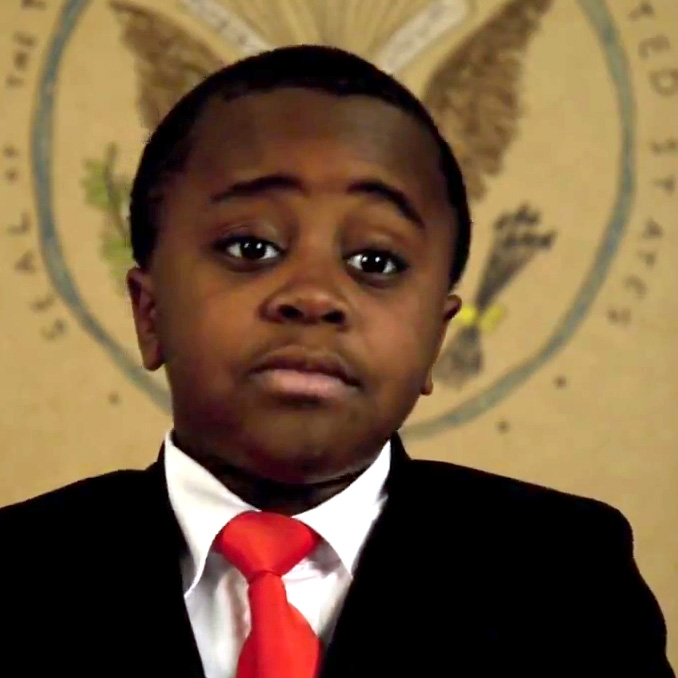
- Novak as Kid President in 2013
- Born: Robby Novak; October 24, 2003 (age 23); Henderson, Tennessee, U.S.
- Occupation: Media personality
- Years active: 2012–2016; 2019; 2022–present
- Known for: Kid President

Robby Novak (born October 24, 2003) is an American actor, media personality and former YouTuber best known for portraying Kid President on YouTube and on television.

== Early life ==
Novak was born on October 24, 2003, and hails from Henderson, Tennessee. He and his sister, Lexi, were adopted by David and Lori Novak.

== Career ==
Novak released his first YouTube video in July 2012, on the channel SoulPancake. His breakout video, which has 50 million views as of May 2026, is titled "A Pep Talk from Kid President to You."

Novak is featured in a series of YouTube videos and in a television show, produced by actor Rainn Wilson. Novak's first YouTube clip as Kid President, written and directed by his brother-in-law Brad Montague, was uploaded in the summer of 2012 and subsequently published on Wilson's YouTube channel in October 2012. Novak was featured in a television show on Hub Network called Kid President: Declaration of Awesome in the summer of 2014.

In October 2019, the first episode of a new YouTube series titled Are We There Yet? was uploaded on Wilson's YouTube channel. The series shows Novak and Montague's trip around the United States in which they meet children who are trying to "make the world a little more awesome".

== Personal life ==
Novak suffers from osteogenesis imperfecta, a condition where his bones break easily. As a result, Novak has had over 70 broken bones and several major surgeries.
