= SummerBreak =

American web television series

- Also known as: @SummerBreak (Seasons 1-3) @SummerBre4k (Season 4) @5ummerBreak (Season 5)
- Genre: Reality Television
- Created by: Billy Parks
- Creative director: Ben Beale
- Starring: See below
- Theme music composer: 10k Islands
- Opening theme: Summerbreak
- Ending theme: Summerbreak
- Country of origin: United States
- Original language: English
- No. of seasons: 5
- No. of episodes: 151

Production
- Executive producers: Judy McGrath; Billy Parks; Jeff Schmidt; Brandon L. Wilson; Alex Keledjian; James Greco
- Producer: Astronauts Wanted
- Production location: Southern California
- Cinematography: MacGregor Barron; Joe Guidry; Alex Wentworth
- Editors: Michael Griffin; Tommy Immer; Irene Young; Rian Bessette; Larissa Mills
- Camera setup: Multi-camera
- Production company: Chernin Group

Original release
- Network: YouTube
- Release: 16 June 2013 – 20 August 2017

SummerBreak is an American reality television Web series that premiered on June 16, 2013, and is available to watch on YouTube. The series documents the lives of several teenagers as they graduate high school and start summer break. The show is set in Southern California and is sponsored by AT&T.

== Plot summary ==
Embark on a transformative summer with a group of teenagers from LA, sharing their stories in their own unique voices. Follow their hopes, dreams, dramas, parties, hook-ups and break-ups during their final summer together. This is the summer when everything changes.

== Cast ==
=== Regular cast ===
- Ray Mancini, Jr. (Season 1-2, guest season 3)
- Kostas Garcia (Season 1, guest season 2, 5)
- Trevis Jackson (Season 1)
- Connor Toast (Season 1)
- Alex Dennett (Season 1)
- Lena Kane (Season 1)
- Nia Caitlyn (Season 1)
- Clara Rose Silverman (Season 1, guest season 2)
- Zaq Moul (Season 1-2, guest season 3)
- Whitney Farrer (Season 2, recurring season 1, guest season 3, 5)
- Jacob Wasserman (Season 2-3)
- Parham Mansourian (Season 2)
- Katheryn Clark (Season 2)
- Josephine Canseco (Season 2)
- Dash Dabrofsky (Season 2-3)
- Baylynne Williford (Season 2, guest season 4)
- Aakeem Andrada (Season 2, guest season 4)
- Yahn Bruggeman (Season 3)
- Sofia Arevalo (Season 3)
- Shea Copeland (Season 3)
- Noah Gains (Season 3)
- Justin Nelson (Season 3)
- Hayley Finkelstein (Season 3)
- Ava Sambora (Season 3)
- Ava Lane (Season 3, recurring season 2)
- Alahna "Arad" Rad (Season 3)
- Atiana De La Hoya (Season 4)
- Ben Segal (Season 4, guest season 5)
- Alexis Boyd-Holling (Season 4, guest season 5)
- Chandler Gee (Season 4)
- Jessica Romoff (Season 4)
- Kaylee Williford (Season 4, guest season 5)
- Zoe Newkirk (Season 4)
- Gianna Di Tullio (Season 4, guest season 5)
- Jakob Katchem (Season 4)
- Josef Katchem (Season 4)
- Madi Burton (Season 4)
- Nastasya Generalova (Season 5)
- Maya Jenson (Season 5)
- Lily Kaplan (Season 5)
- Lena Winner (Season 5)
- Jite Agege (Season 5)
- Jack Butler (Season 5)
- Jack "Jaboy" Houghton (Season 5)
- Ivy Schoffman (Season 5)
- Isaiah Wood (Season 5)
- Harlan Goldman-Belsma (Season 5)
- Cairo Reid (Season 5)
- Amindi K. Frost (Season 5)

=== Recurring cast ===
- Charles "CBass" Bannon (Season 1)
- Karli Vaughan (Season 1)
- Tori Keeth (Season 4)

=== Guest cast ===
- Ray Mancini (Season 1-2)
- Trenton Jackson (Season 1)
- Tehran Von Ghasri (Season 1)
- Raina Lawson (Season 1)
- Erik Griffin (Season 1)
- Jose Canseco (Season 2)
- Andrea Russett (Season 2)
- Cody Ayala (Season 3)
- Mila Cuda (Season 4)
- Brooke Di Tullio (Season 4)
- Miranda Di Tullio (Season 4)

== List of episodes ==
=== Season one ===
1. "Summer Starts with Romance and Bromance"
2. "Zaq Surprises Clara, Alex & Connor Play the Field"
3. "Zaq Wasn't Invited to Connor's BBQ?"
4. "Ray Meets a Girl and Zaq Gets Left Out"
5. "Brunch and Gurt with Nia, Lena, Clara, Alex, & Karli"
6. "Trevis, Zaq, and Ray's Big Bowling Bet"
7. "The Girls Load and Unload"
8. "Ray and Whitney Go on a Date"
9. "Hot Guys and Tater Tots"
10. "I Was Worried I Wasn't Going to Make Any Friends"
11. "Are You Over 18?"
12. "Breakfast, Bottles, and Being Just Friends"
13. "Catalina, Here We Come"
14. "The Guys Pitch a Tent"
15. "Don't Subtweet Your Homies"
16. "Clara and the Boys Get Ready To Scuba Dive"
17. "Pranks and Getting Even"
18. "Team Heartbreaker"
19. "Zaq, Connor, & Their Girls"
20. "Kostas Hangs Out with Alex and CBass"
21. "Fighting Friends and Fireworks"
22. "Ray and.....Whitney?"
23. "Clara and Rain"
24. "Connor, Zaq, Clara, and Raina Go Cliff Jumping"
25. "Alex Races Kostas and Zaq"
26. "Turning 18 and Defining Relationships"
27. "The Party Continues"
28. "Trevis Leaves for College"
29. "#WhitRay Date Night"
30. "Kostas and Raina Go On a Date"
31. "Love and War"
32. "Forgive and Forget"
33. "Get Over It"
34. "Excuse Me, I'm Talking"
35. "Party House"
36. "Kiss and Tell"
37. "Playing With Fire"
38. "When Whitney Calls"
39. "No More Hookups"
40. "Chef Clara"
41. "Nothing To Hide"
42. "On the Road"
43. "Morning Pranks"
44. "Sand Boarding"
45. "What Up San Fran"
46. "San Francisco Part 1"
47. "San Francisco Part 2"
48. "Goodbye Connor"
49. "Heart to Heart"
50. "Let's Eat"
51. "The Last Day of Summer"

=== Season two ===
1. "It's Summer Break, Once Again"
2. "Let the Future Worry About the Future"
3. "Hype In Havasu"
4. "MANicures and Friend Zones"
5. "We're Just Friends"
6. "The Start of Something New"
7. "Third Wheeling and Spicy Moves"
8. "We Made It"
9. "You Like Her, She Likes You"
10. "Into the Wild"
11. "Are You With Us, Or Are You With Them?"
12. "You Could Call It A Crush"
13. "Betrayal Shows Your True Side"
14. "Don't Mess With Bama"
15. "You Can't Rely On Anyone For Happiness"
16. "I Don't Get Why You're Trying To Start Drama"
17. "Sushi Success"
18. "You Were Like My Sister"
19. "A Lot Went Down, Dude"
20. "Bump In The Road"
21. "Where Did The Time Go?
22. "Off To The Desert"
23. "You Know I Care About You"
24. "We're Growing Up But It's Not The End"

=== Season three ===
1. "Times Are Changing, We're Growing Up"
2. "So Wise With Your Words, Bro"
3. "What's Up With You and Dash?"
4. "Go With The Flow"
5. "Bon Voyage"
6. "What Does That Make Us?"
7. "I Thought The Beef Was Over"
8. "She Just Kept Texting Me"
9. "She's Into Another Guy"
10. "No Boys Allowed"
11. "We're Gonna Talk This Out"
12. "Say It to My Face"
13. "Let's Get It"
14. "We're All Here for You"
15. "Good Vibes Only"
16. "San Fran! San Fran!"
17. "Take It All In"
18. "We At the Spartan Race"
19. "The Group Chat"
20. "I Just Want to Say Sorry"
21. "You Guys Don't Know Me"
22. "If You Can't Handle the Heat"
23. "Last Time to Have the Humes"
24. "Last Times Together"
25. "Where Did the Time Go? Part 1"
26. "The Best of Homies Part 2"

=== Season four ===
1. "The Summer of a Lifetime Begins"
2. "Jakob Wants to Date Himself"
3. "This Is Revenge"
4. "Whatever Happens, Happens"
5. "When You Look This Good, You Can't Lose"
6. "Relationships Are a Crazy Thing"
7. "Strength Though Adversity"
8. "A Thousand Feet Up"
9. "Spaghetti Tacos"
10. "You Look Like a Pumpkin"
11. "I Just Sensed Tension"
12. "Third Wheelin'"
13. "Communication is Key"
14. "You Can Always Learn More"
15. "Some People Just Need Attention"
16. "A Summer Fling"
17. "I Don't Associate With Liars"
18. "Bring the Good Vibes Back"
19. "We Don't Cry Over Anybody"
20. "A Truck of Emotions"
21. "Rejection is Tough"
22. "All Good Things Come to an End"
23. "I See You, Pismo"
24. "Just Like That, It's All Over"

=== Season five ===
1. "What Happens in Vegas"
2. "I Will Love You Always"
3. "It's Gametime"
4. "We're Just Friends"
5. "Adventure to Disneyland"
6. "No Drama at Disney, Please"
7. "Girl Code"
8. "Why Aren't We As Close"
9. "Just Be Careful"
10. "I'm So Awkward"
11. "Try To Be Original"
12. "The Slumber Party"
13. "Mairo?"
14. "We Almost Died"
15. "Squashing Beef before the Ski Trip"
16. "Mammoth Bound"
17. "Vibes in Mammoth"
18. "Things Get Heated"
19. "No More Cliques"
20. "We've All Gotten Closer"
21. "I Just Want To Apologize"
22. "Tense Bonfire Vibes"
23. "The Invite List"
24. "80s Theme Party and a Goodbye"
25. "The Last Trip to San Diego"
26. "I Love You Guys"

== Production ==
The series premiered on YouTube on June 16, 2013. The first episode currently has 1.5M views.

The show was renewed for a second season which began on June 24, 2014.

The show was renewed for a third season which premiered on June 21, 2015.

In 2016 a fourth season was ordered which premiered on June 26, 2016.

On January 10, 2017 it was announced via the official SummerBreak Instagram account that they are now casting for season 5.

Season 5 premiered on June 25, 2017.
