= Brittany Furlan =

American Internet personality

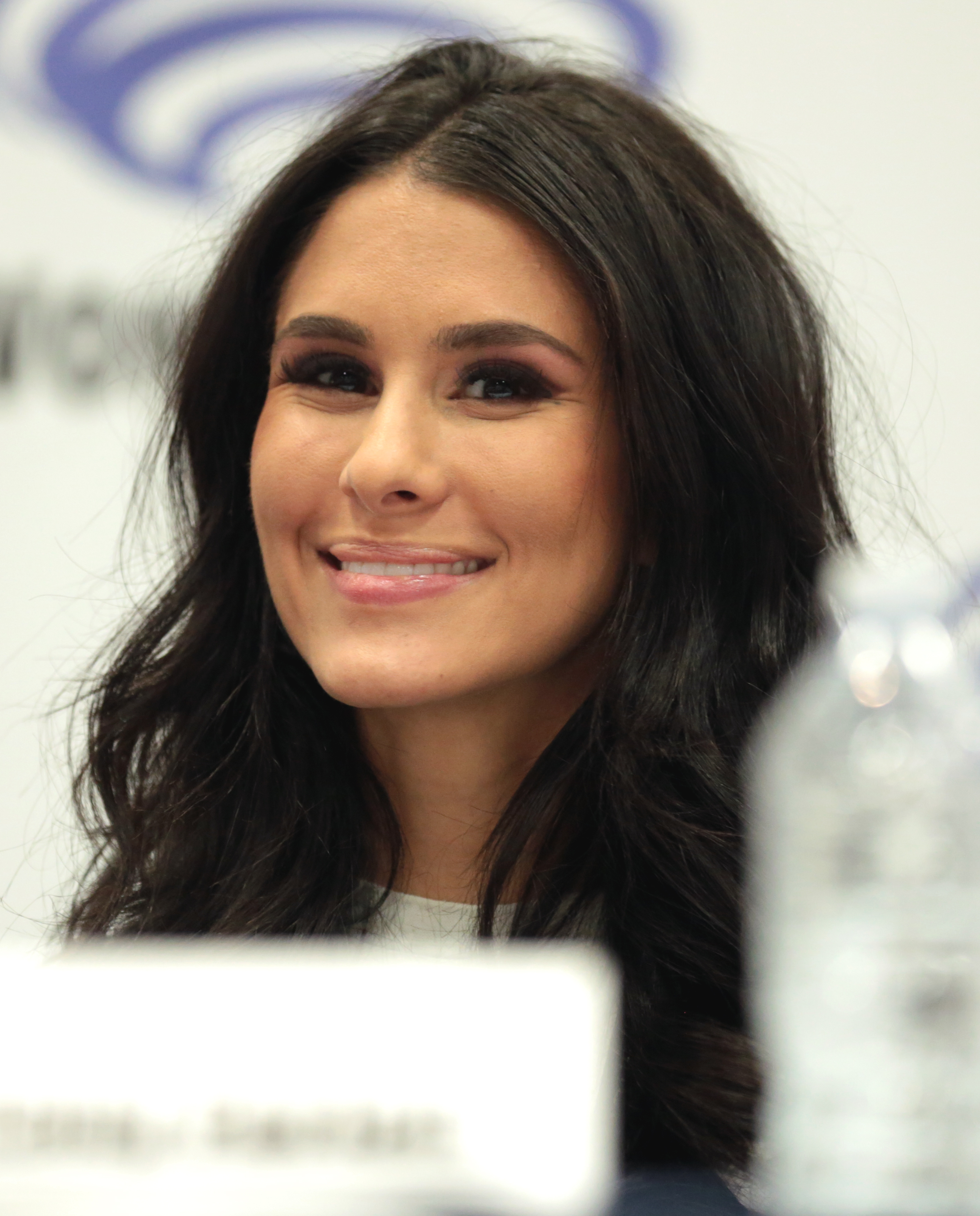
- Furlan in 2017
- Other name: Brittany Furlan Lee
- Occupations: Internet personality; actress; comedian
- Known for: Vine
- Spouse: Tommy Lee (m. 2019)

Brittany Furlan is an American internet personality, actress and comedian based in Los Angeles. She was the most followed female video star on Vine until November 2015. She was the fifth-most-followed viner, with 9.9 million followers when Vine ended, (Note: In January 2017) and the second-most-followed woman.

She was declared by Time in 2015 to be one of the most influential people on the Internet.

== Career ==
Furlan attempted a television career before becoming a star on Vine, and signed with content network Endemol.

Furlan was embroiled in a controversy during the 2014 Daytime Emmys Red Carpet show when she told actor Ryan Paevey, "We're going to get you away from us before we rape you."

== Personal life ==
In early 2017, Furlan began a relationship with Mötley Crüe drummer Tommy Lee. On February 14, 2018, they announced their engagement on Instagram. They were married a year later on February 14, 2019.

Furlan has stated that she does not plan to have children.

== Filmography ==
Year	Title	Role	Notes
2015	We Are Your Friends	Sara	Film
2015	Wrestling Isn't Wrestling	Goldberg	Short film
2018	The Unicorn	Samantha	Film
2018	The American Meme	Herself	Documentary
2019	The Dirt	Bandmate Girlfriend	Film
2019	Airplane Mode	Herself	Film
2019	E! True Hollywood Story	Herself	Episode: "Is Fame an Addiction?"
2020	Spy Intervention	Brianna Brown	Film
2021–present	Paradise City	Janis	TV spinoff of American Satan
2022	Good Mourning	Waitress	Film
2024	Drugstore June	Anthony's mother	Film
2025	High Rollers	Adrianna	Film

== Awards and nominations ==
Year	Nominated	Award	Result
2014	Streamy Awards	Actress in a Comedy	Nominated
2014	Streamy Awards	Audience Choice Award for Entertainer of the Year	Nominated
2014	Streamy Awards	Vine Comedian	Nominated
2014	Streamy Awards	Viner of the Year	Won
2015	Teen Choice Awards	Choice Web: Viner	Nominated
