= Sorted Food =

British YouTube cooking channel and food website

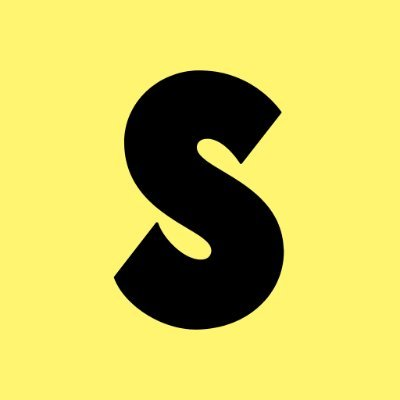

YouTube information
- Channel: SORTEDFood
- Years active: 2010–present
- Genre: Cooking
- Subscribers: 2.92 million
- Views: 1.39 billion
- Last updated: 9 February 2026
- Website: sortedfood.com

Sorted Food is a British YouTube channel and food community created on 10 March 2010, by Benjamin Ebbrell, Michael Huttlestone, Jamie Spafford, and Barry Taylor. In addition to producing cooking videos and live events, Sorted Food publishes cookbooks and manages the subscription-based recipe app "Sidekick".

== History ==
The Sorted Food YouTube channel was launched in March 2010 by school friends Jamie Spafford, Ben Ebbrell, Barry Taylor, and Mike Huttlestone from Hertfordshire. Around 2014, James Currie, who met Ebbrell in culinary school, joined as a developmental chef and later an on-camera personality. The channel's recipes are designed to be accessible to a wide audience, an approach originating from Ebbrell, the only founder with culinary training. Ebbrell initially suggested simple, affordable recipes for the others as an alternative to prepackaged meals.

In May 2021, James Currie left to pursue a career as a professional chef working as a recipe maker for a food-box company and briefly also for a "chef to your doorstep" startup as a chef. The following month, Sorted Food announced Ankush 'Kush' Bhasin as their new head of food. Bhasin previously worked as a development chef at Belmond Le Manoir aux Quat'Saisons under Raymond Blanc and as an executive sous-chef at Benares in Mayfair, London under Atul Kochhar.

As of December 2023 James Currie can be seen again in Sorted’s latest YouTube videos.

== Current content ==
In April 2021, the company had 12 employees based in Tower Hill. By November 2022, this had increased to 25 employees.

Sorted Food collaborates with various brands on sponsored content, including Visit The USA, Kenwood Kitchen Appliances, Ford, Heinz, Android, and Blizzard. A portion of their video content focuses on travel and destination marketing, exploring foods, cuisines, and cultures from different locations.

== Publishing ==
Sorted Food's first two cookbooks, A Recipe for Student Survival (2008) and A Rookies Guide to Crackin' Cooking (2012), were self-published through "Co-Incidence Ventures" in paperback and hardback editions. In 2012, they signed with Penguin Books, releasing the beginner's cookbook Beginners Get... Sorted and the eBook Food with Friends, also available in individual chapters. Desserts in Duvets followed in 2017, funded by a Kickstarter campaign supported by their online community.

In 2021, the company reprinted and sold copies of Can't be Arsed 1 and 2.

== Reach and awards ==
As of 8 September 2026, the YouTube channel has over 3 million subscribers and more than 1.5 billion video views with 2.9k videos. Sorted Food maintains a significant social media presence, with followers across platforms like Twitter, Facebook, and Instagram. In 2014, they were ranked 4th in The Guardian's "30 Under 30: The Top Young People in Digital Media".

Their accolades include the "Best Online Program - Entertainment Award" (2011 Banff World Media Festival), the "New Media Award" (2014 Guild of Food Writers awards), and the "Best Online Content" award (2017 UK Blog Award). They were also nominated for "Best Series of Videos" at the CMAs for their "Game Changers" collaboration with the US Tourism Board. Ebbrell won the Good Food Channel's Market Kitchen "next celebrity chef" competition.

Sorted Food has been featured in various media outlets, including Observer Magazine, Good Morning Britain, Blue Peter, Heat, The Sun, Delicious Magazine, Russell Howard's Christmas special, Radio 2, BBC 5Live, Shortlist, TES, New Business Magazine, and Sky News in the UK, and The TODAY Show in the US.
