= Kali Muscle =

American bodybuilder and actor

- Born: Chuck Kirkendall; February 18, 1975 (age 51); Oakland, California, U.S.
- Occupations: Internet personality, entrepreneur, bodybuilder
- Spouse: Helena Kirkendall
- Children: Kali Muscle Kirkendall II. Brooke Taylor Kirkendall

Chuck Kirkendall (born February 18, 1975), known professionally as Kali Muscle, is an American bodybuilder, YouTuber and actor who has appeared in commercials for Taco Bell, GEICO, Snickers, Comcast, Honda, Go-Gurt and others.

== Career ==
Kali Muscle has appeared as the bodybuilder in a Geico ad where he directs traffic. He also made an appearance in the music video for country singer Jamey Johnson. Kali Muscle has also been featured in other music videos, including Kendrick Lamar's These Walls.

Kali Muscle runs a fitness YouTube channel which as of 2023 has amassed over 3.9 million subscribers and over 1.06 billion views. His channel is mainly about bodybuilding and training with limited equipment. He also has music videos, mukbangs and short skits on his channel.

One of his early acting roles was in the 2011 pilot for the canceled NBC Wonder Woman TV series starring Adrianne Palicki and Pedro Pascal. The following year he appeared in the TV film Applebaum, as well as in The Dog Who Saved the Holidays starring Shelley Long, Gary Valentine and Dean Cain, where he played the part of Mikey. In 2014 he appeared in the episode Road to Natesville of the TV series Raising Hope. Kali Muscle played the role of Bones in the 2020 comedy film Bullet Ride (formerly known as The Big Shot) directed by Demetrius Navarro and Valente Rodriguez.

== Health ==
On November 7, 2021, Kirkendall suffered a heart attack and was admitted to the hospital. He claimed he had a complete occlusion (100%) in his left coronary artery. Emergency surgery was performed and he was later discharged from the hospital.

On 17 January 2026, Kirkendall suffered a second heart attack, surviving following an induced coma which lasted 3 days. Following the incident, he was quoted as saying, "I'm telling you right now, if you think more drugs, more steroids, more intensity mean a better quality of life, then you are mistaken because I thought the same thing. Muscles don't mean immortality. A strong body doesn’t cancel bad choices and your heart keeps scores, quietly."

== Selected filmography ==
=== Film ===
Year	Title	Role	Notes #
2011	Wonder Woman	Super Soldier	TV movie
2012	Applebaum	Bodybuilder	TV movie
2012	Crispus Attucks: Today Was a Good Day		
2012	Internal Behaviors Part 2: The Regurgitation	Inmate	
2012	Savior	Boss	
2012	The Dog Who Saved the Holidays	Mikey	TV movie
2013	White T	Bouncer	
2014	Roscoe and Maggie	Ghoul	
2014	The Liaison		
2020	Bullet Ride	Bones	

=== Television ===
Year	Title	Episode #	Role	Notes #
2011	Mr. Sunshine	Lingerie Football	Team trainer	
2012	Wilfred	Letting Go	Bodybuilder	
2012	Workaholics	The Lord's Force	David	
2014	Raising Hope	Road to Natesville	Brett	
