= Joe Penna =

Brazilian musician (born 1987)

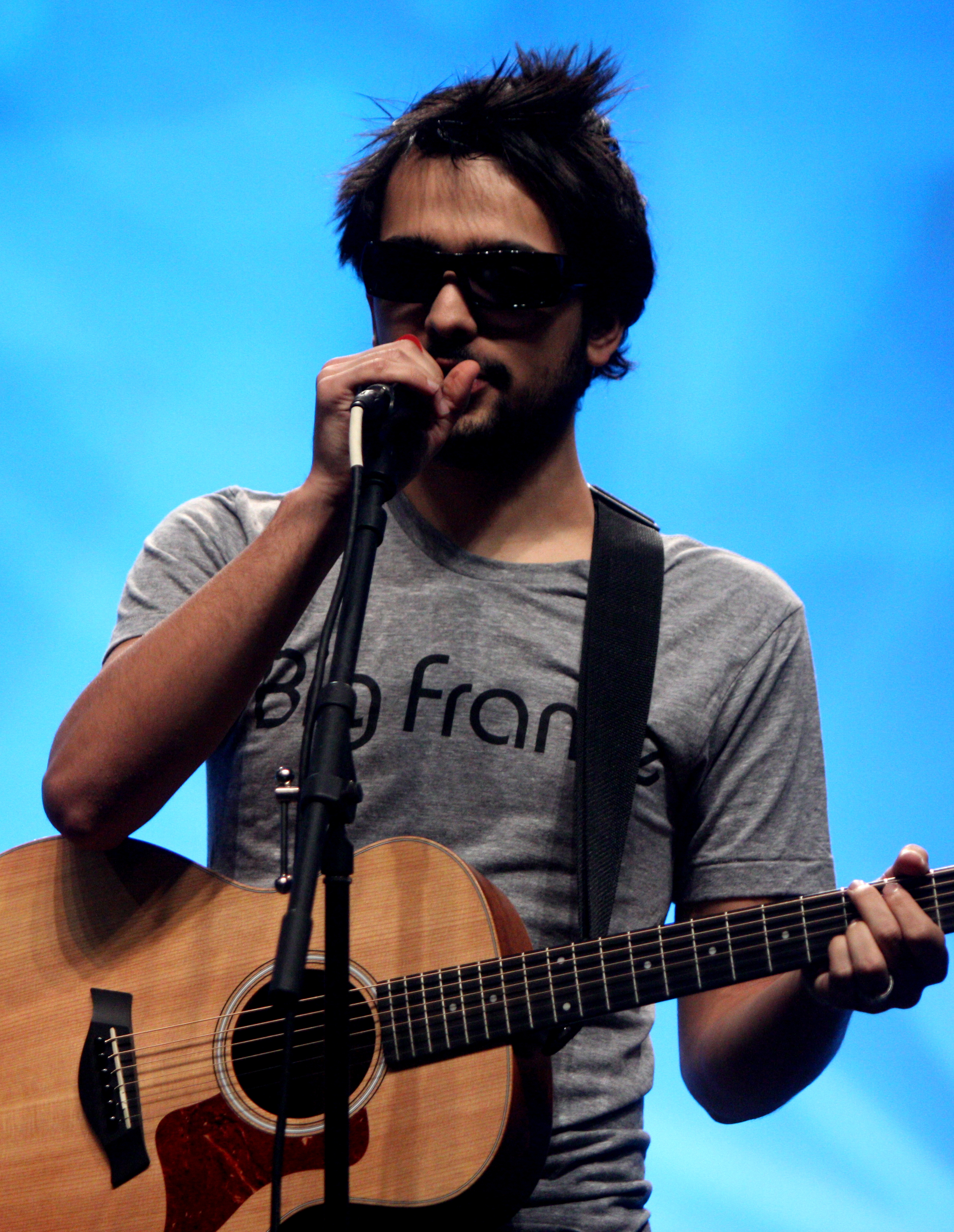
- Penna in concert, June 2012
- Born: Jônatas de Moura Penna; May 29, 1987 (age 39); São Paulo, Brazil
- Known for: Animation; music; stop motion; videography
- Spouse: Sarah Penna (m. 2011)
- Musical career
- Instruments: Guitar; bass guitar; drums; keyboards; vocals
- Years active: 2006–present

YouTube information
- Channel: MysteryGuitarMan
- Years active: 2006–present
- Genres: Music; vlog; stop motion; comedy
- Subscribers: 2.57 million
- Views: 386 million
- Last updated: June 20, 2026

Jônatas de Moura Penna, best known as Joe Penna (born May 29, 1987), is a Brazilian filmmaker, technologist and musician, known from both his YouTube channel MysteryGuitarMan and his feature films. He resides in Los Angeles, California.

== Film ==
In March 2016, his short film Turning Point was selected to play at the Tribeca Film Festival.

In February 2017, Penna began production of his directorial debut film, Arctic. It was shot in Iceland and stars Mads Mikkelsen. Arctic garnered enthusiastic reviews as an Official Selection for the 2018 Cannes Film Festival. Its theatrical premiere was on February 1, 2019.

In June 2019, Penna began shooting on the sci-fi movie Stowaway starring Anna Kendrick and Toni Collette.

In the wake of the COVID-19 pandemic, the release of Stowaway was delayed from its initial summer 2020 release by Sony. Netflix subsequently acquired the rights to the film, which achieved the #1 spot worldwide. This success led Netflix to also acquire the US rights to Penna's earlier film Arctic, which similarly achieved #1 ranking in the country.

In August 2022, Penna signed on to direct the sci-fi thriller Trespasser, produced by Jason Fuchs and Brad Fuller. The film, based on a Black List screenplay follows a father and daughter living in isolation who encounter a mysterious otherworldly creature.

In December 2022, Penna was tapped to produce Anna Kendrick's directorial debut Woman of the Hour. The thriller, based on the true story of Cheryl Bradshaw, a bachelorette on the 1970s TV matchmaking show The Dating Game whose chosen bachelor turned out to be serial killer Rodney Alcala, was acquired by multiple international distributors at the Toronto International Film Festival. The film sold to Netflix for $11M and debuted with a 100% rating on Rotten Tomatoes.

== YouTube ==
Penna maintains the YouTube channel MysteryGuitarMan. He registered the channel on June 16, 2006.

By January 2011, MysteryGuitarMan became the most subscribed channel in Brazil. As of January 2024, his channel has garnered over 2.6 million subscribers, and his videos have accrued nearly 400 million views.

On September 11, 2005, Penna launched a second YouTube channel, where he uploads his making-of videos and vlogs. Within 6 hours, it became the third most subscribed channel in Brazil.

In 2007, Penna was one of the first YouTube channels to receive mainstream media coverage, including attention from DC Fox News, after his video The Puzzle was featured on the front page of YouTube.

In 2009, Penna was again seen on the front page of YouTube with his video Guitar: Impossible, which has been covered by De Wereld Draait Door, the highest-rated primetime show in the Netherlands. On December 6, 2009, Penna was featured on FM4, an Austrian national radio station. Shortly after uploaded, his "Guitar: Impossible" video was featured on the MSN.com front page.

Best Buy announced Penna as the $15,000 winner of their Tech-U-Out Video Challenge. He was also a finalist in the "Oreo Global Moments" video competition. Ford selected Penna as a Fiesta Agent for the 2009 Ford Fiesta Movement. Penna's "Guitar: Impossible" video was also featured by YouTube as one of the best videos of 2009.

In 2010, Penna's Root Beer Mozart was featured on CNN's morning show Morning Express with Robin Meade and on Germany's nationally broadcast Taff show.

== Television ==
In 2009, Penna directed a commercial starring Rhett and Link titled T-Shirt War. It garnered international attention. Shortly after, Penna was selected as one of the top 10 new directors at the 20th Cannes Lions Saatchi & Saatchi New Directors' Showcase.

Following the success of the original, Penna and the original cast were hired to produce a national television and cinema spot for Coca-Cola and McDonald's. A year later, Penna directed and starred in yet another commercial for the two companies.

In June 2010, Penna was highlighted by CNN Money on their Best Jobs series.

His stop-motion short film Guitar: Impossible was selected to be displayed at the Guggenheim museum.

In 2012, Penna co-wrote and directed an original interactive thriller series titled Meridian starring Orlando Jones and Rick Overton in conjunction with Fourth Wall Studios.

In August 2014, Penna was announced as the host of Xploration Earth 2050, a technology-oriented television series. Xploration Station went on to receive eight Daytime Emmy Award nominations.

== Technology ==
In May 2023, Penna was part of a team that authored a paper on text-to-image generation which introduced PickScore, a scoring function showing superior performance in predicting human preferences. The team recommended using PickScore for evaluating future text-to-image generation models and using Pick-a-Pic prompts as a more relevant metric than the commonly used MS-COCO and Fréchet inception distance, the latter showing a negative correlation correlated to human preferences. This paper was followed by the release of another paper detailing improvements to latent diffusion models for high-resolution image synthesis.

In 2024, Penna joined the founding team of Reve AI, a Palo Alto-based startup that emerged from stealth in March 2025 with the launch of its text-to-image generation model Reve Image 1.0. Initially known by the code name "Halfmoon" on social media, the model debuted at the top of third-party benchmarks.

In March 2026, Penna's role as Chief Creative Technologist at InterPositive was made public when Netflix acquired the company, which had been founded in stealth by Ben Affleck. The acquisition, reported by Bloomberg to be worth as much as $600 million, brought the team into Netflix and made Penna and Affleck senior advisers to the company.
