= Brian Dannelly =

American film director and screenwriter

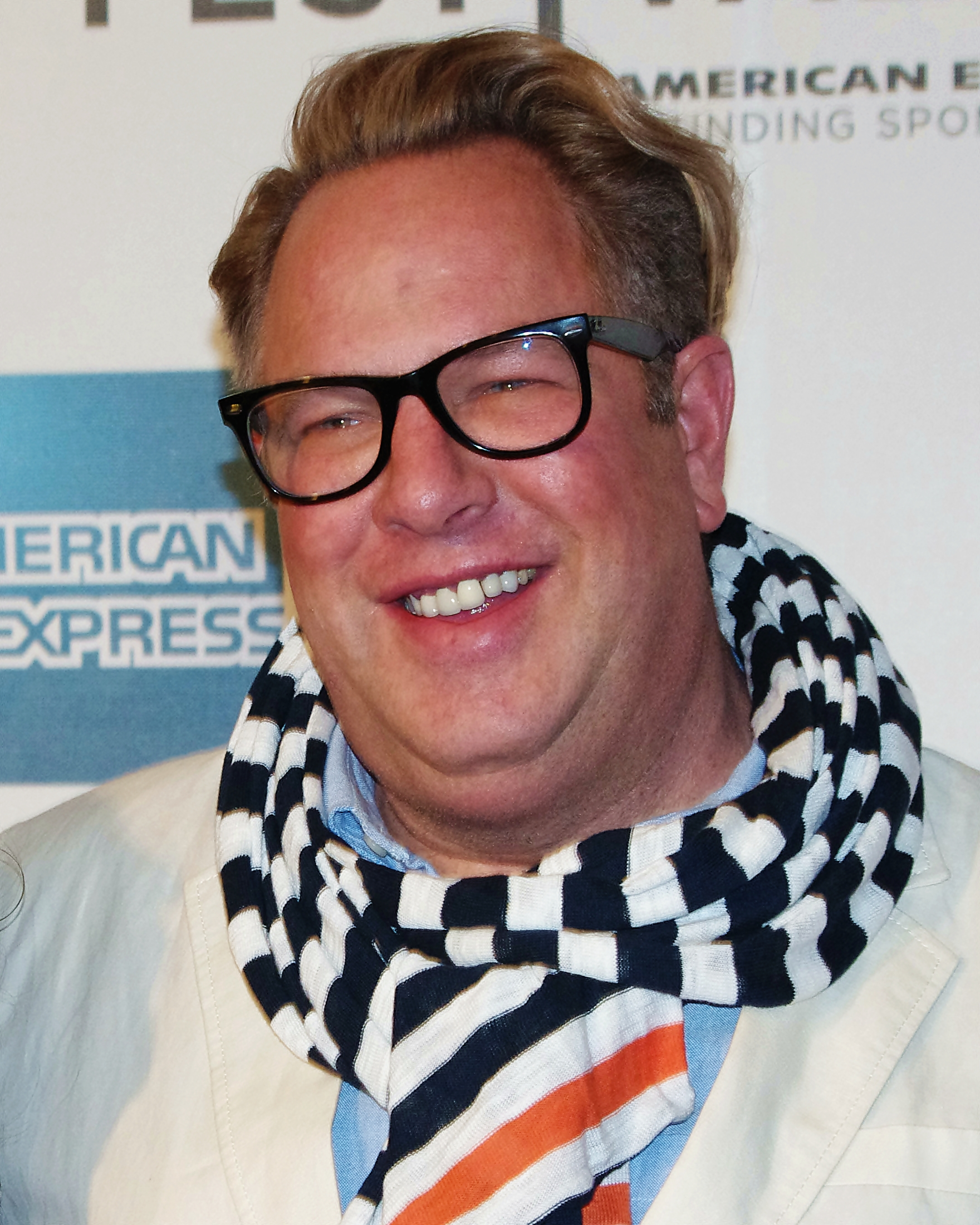
- Dannelly at the 2012 Tribeca Film Festival premiere of Struck by Lightning
- Born: Würzburg, Germany
- Occupations: Director, screenwriter, producer
- Years active: 2000 – present

Brian Dannelly is a German-born American film director and screenwriter best known for his work on the 2004 film Saved!

== Early life ==
Dannelly was born in Würzburg, Germany then moved with his family to Baltimore, Maryland at age 11. He was raised Catholic; he attended a Catholic elementary school, Arlington Baptist High School in Baltimore, and a Jewish summer camp. He was expelled from first grade for hitting a nun, and later expelled from high school—which he describes as "one of the strictest schools in the nation"—for excessive demerits. He started questioning his sexuality in high school, saying "I remember I'd pray every night that I wasn't gay, and please God, please God, anything I could do—just don't make this happen." He came out at the age of 17 and was thrown out of his house by his parents, who eventually came to accept his sexuality.

Dannelly graduated from the University of Maryland, Baltimore County with a degree in visual arts in 1997.

== Career ==
Dannelly wrote and directed the short film "He Bop" in 2000, and in 2004, he made the feature film Saved!, which he directed and co-wrote with Michael Urban. He had begun to write the Saved! script after the Columbine High School massacre in 1999, which he claims took him "back to [his] roots" in a Christian high school. He and Urban began writing the script while attending the American Film Institute Conservatory. Much of the story was drawn from his own experiences with "conservative Christian subculture", including Christian rock concerts, being "this gay kid in a Christian school" and having visions of Jesus. He said "In the Baptist school there was the one Jewish girl that everyone was trying to save, there was a girl who got pregnant, there was a gay kid"—all principal characters in Saved! He claims that nothing in the film came from his imagination: "Everything in the movie comes from either something I experienced, or something I witnessed, or something I researched."

After Saved! was released, Dannelly became a regular series director on the television show Weeds. He also directed the 2006 pilot episode of Help Me Help You and Pushing Daisies' 2007 episode "Corpsicle". His most recent film, Runner Up, about a beauty pageant queen who organizes a pageant in a women's prison, is currently in production. He was set to direct a film based on The Guided Man by L. Sprague de Camp, but the project was shelved. He has written the spec script titled Army Geek.

In 2017, Dannelly worked as a director on two episodes of the second season of the Netflix series Haters Back Off, starring Colleen Ballinger (Miranda Sings), Angela Kinsey and Erik Stocklin.
