= Miranda Sings =

Fictional character played by Colleen Ballinger

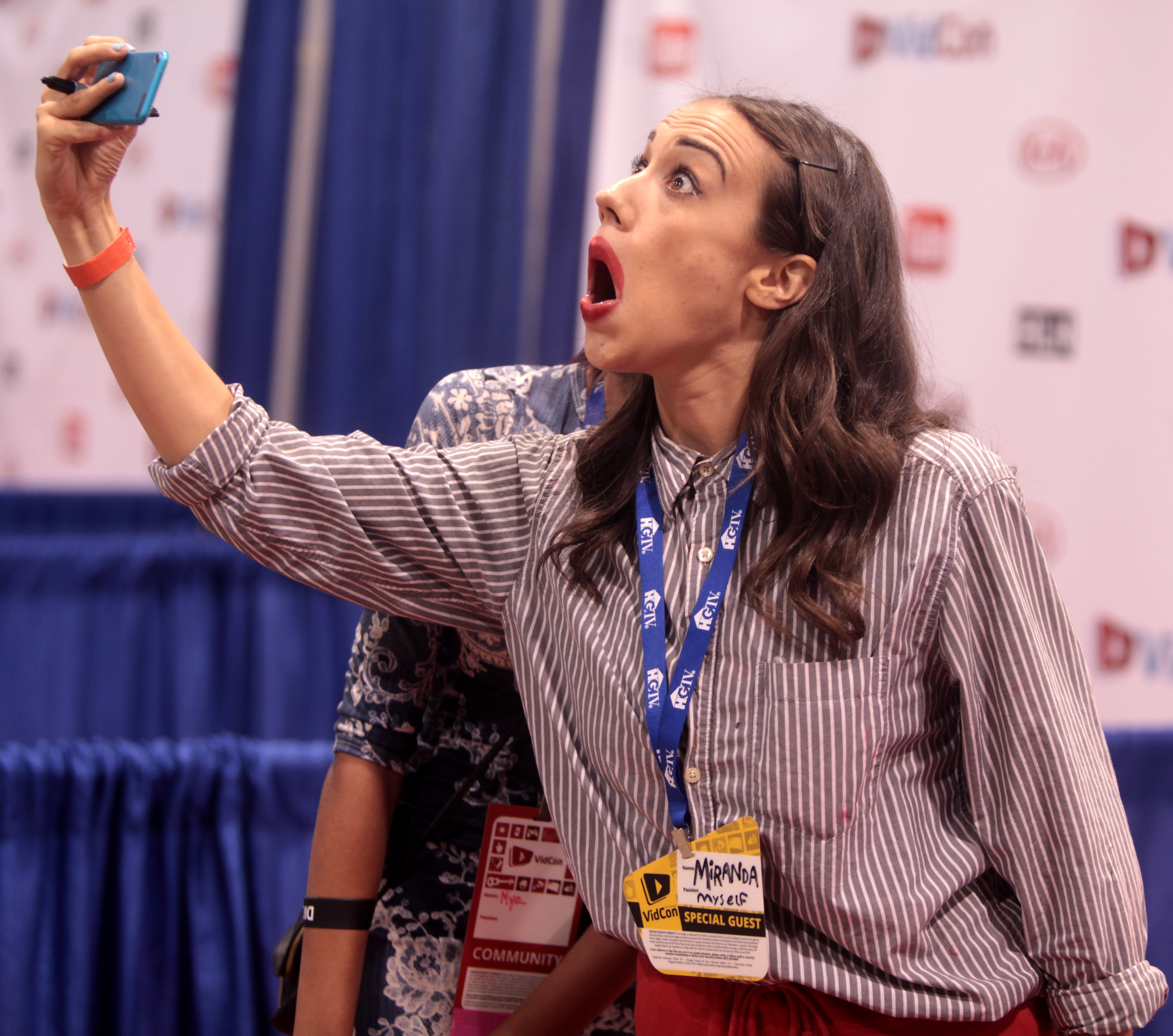
"Miranda Sings" at VidCon 2014

Miranda Sings is a fictional character created and portrayed by American comedian, actress, singer and YouTube personality Colleen Ballinger that first appeared on the Internet in 2008. Ballinger displays videos of the comically talentless, egotistical, misguided and quirky character on her YouTube channel. In these videos, the character sings and dances badly, gives inept "tutorials", recounts her daily activities, discusses current events that she often misunderstands, collaborates with other YouTubers, and rants about her critics, reading examples of hate mail directed at the character on social media; she responds to them with her catchphrase: "Haters Back Off!"

Inspired by early YouTube videos and rude classmates, Ballinger created the character as a satire of bad but arrogant singers who believe that posting their videos on YouTube will lead to them breaking into show business. As of July 2021, the Miranda Sings YouTube channel has more than 2 billion views and 10 million subscribers, and Miranda has accumulated more than 12 million TikTok followers and 6 million Instagram followers. The character also has an active presence on other social media platforms.

Since 2009, in addition to her internet videos, Ballinger has presented live comedy acts, in character as Miranda Sings, at first in cabaret spaces and later in theaters in New York, London, and other cities in the US, Canada, Europe, Australia and elsewhere; she toured regularly beginning in 2014. Her acts include Miranda's signature off-key singing of pop music hits and show tunes, with introductions focusing on the character's backstory. Her delivery is full of malapropisms, mondegreens and spoonerisms, and the acts incorporate interaction with audience volunteers, giving a "voice lesson" to, or singing a duet with, Broadway or other musical celebrities, reading hate mail, seeking a boyfriend, and singing while being stabbed through the neck in her "magic trick". One of Miranda's 2018 tour stops was filmed and released as a 2019 Netflix comedy special.

The character has appeared in television and web series and other media. Her first network television appearance was in a 2012 episode of the TV show Victorious. In 2014, she guest-starred in character on an episode of Comedians in Cars Getting Coffee with Jerry Seinfeld and appeared on The Tonight Show Starring Jimmy Fallon. In 2015, she released a New York Times #1 best-selling book, written in Miranda's voice, titled Selp-Helf. Miranda is the main character in the Netflix original series Haters Back Off (2016–2017). Ballinger won a Teen Choice Award and a Streamy Award for her Miranda videos.

== Description ==
=== YouTube videos ===
Since 2008, Ballinger has posted more than 800 videos as the character Miranda Sings on the YouTube channel of the same name. The character is a satire of bad but egotistical singers who post internet videos of themselves singing in hopes of breaking into show business, despite the realistic or cruel comments of "haters" who comment on their videos. More generally, it is a satire of pretentious and untalented performers everywhere. Miranda is supposedly a home-schooled single woman who lives with her mother, uncle and baby. She is narcissistic, infantilized, overconfident and has a relentless ambition to achieve show business fame.

In the videos, the Miranda character sings in a comically off-key, yet plausible, voice and covers pop music hits, show tunes and original songs. Sometimes she discusses current events, which she usually misunderstands, gives inept mock-"tutorials", rants about her internet critics or discusses the character's backstory. She uses spoonerisms, mondegreens and malapropisms, is irritable, ludicrously self-absorbed, narcissistic, prudish and self-righteous, socially awkward, and has a defiant, arrogant attitude. The Times describes the character as "self-obsessed and immune to criticism". Her videos "exhibit the near-tragic extent of Miranda’s idiocy." As Robert Lloyd, writing for the Los Angeles Times put it, "the ferocious enormousness of Miranda’s self-regard, which blots out nearly everything around her, is inversely proportional to her talent." To viewers who take the videos seriously and offer criticism, she responds with the catchphrase, "Haters Back Off!", telling these critics that they are "just jealous" and that "haters make me famous".

The character displays eccentric facial traits such as unusually active eyebrows and a crooked smile described as a "side smirk". Her head is cocked to one side, and her pronunciation quirks include an emphasis on the use of a prominent hard 'g' (in such words as 'singing' and 'song'). In place of lyrics that she cannot remember, the character "scat" sings. She wears bright red lipstick drawn beyond the borders of her lips, her hair pulled up at the temples to expose the maximum amount of forehead, dresses in mismatched out-of-style clothing (such as a men's shirt buttoned to the neck with red sweatpants), and often dances stiffly to the music she is performing. Miranda's views of society and morality are politically incorrect, and she displays a strong prudish aversion to anything risque, which she calls "porn". Since 2013, Miranda has collaborated on videos that other YouTubers display on their channels. People magazine featured a Miranda collaboration with Tyler Oakley and Bethany Mota. Her YouTube audience was relatively modest until early 2013, when her audience reached 150,000 subscribers, and began to expand rapidly.

In 2018, Ballinger became pregnant with her first child, and Miranda announced her own pregnancy on YouTube. Ballinger created a story arc on Miranda's channel in which the character claimed to be the "virgin Miranda", with a virgin conception; she mentioned this soon afterwards on Live with Kelly and Ryan. After Ballinger gave birth in December 2018, she tweeted about it from Miranda's account. Since then, Miranda has incorporated footage of the baby into her videos, focusing on how he inconveniences her, is trying to murder her, is "dumb", and is a "cannobel" because of his quest for her breast milk.

=== Live comedy act, early years ===
Since April 2009, in addition to her internet videos, Miranda Sings has performed her one-woman live comedy acts at first at cabaret spaces and later theatres in New York, Los Angeles, Chicago, London, Toronto, Amsterdam, Sydney and other cities in the US, Canada, Europe, Australia, and elsewhere. In 2009, BroadwayWorld.com called her "the hottest, freshest and oddest breakout star in the musical theatre/cabaret scene".

In the live comedy acts, Ballinger begins the show as herself and then transforms onstage into Miranda. Miranda typically sings pop hits and some musical theatre songs in her signature off-key style (one reviewer called this "deranged versions duly delivered with gawky, gurning panache"); gives "voice lessons" or acting lessons to Broadway or West End stars, such as Sutton Foster, Andrew Rannells, and Shoshana Bean, to Broadway casts of shows such as Billy Elliot (to which cast she also gave dance and acting "lessons") and Rock of Ages, and to pop stars such as Ariana Grande and Tori Kelly, in which she is hypercritical of the stars' performances, often telling them that they should leave show business; sings one or more duets with established (and bemused) musical theatre singers; indignantly reads hate mail (bleeping out any profanity) that she has received on her YouTube channel and other social media; interacts with audience volunteers; uses projected presentations containing terrible spelling; and sometimes improvises a song based on audience suggestions. The act has autobiographical elements from Miranda's backstory. In her holiday act, in addition to some of the above, Miranda has recreated the Christmas story "complete with the Three Kings, the Drummer Boy, and Santa Claus, as well as a shockingly dissonant 'Carol of the Bells'" and other Christmas songs.

As an example of the character's delusional arrogance, Miranda stated in her early acts that she expected to perform the role of Elphaba in Wicked on Broadway. During 2009, as part of her act, she announced that she planned to date Cheyenne Jackson (who she did not realize is openly gay) or to find another boyfriend, who must be talented and famous. She was photographed and videotaped together with Jackson at Broadway on Broadway 2009, confronting him about their "relationship", and finally receiving a "first kiss" from him. In 2010, she stated in her videos and comedy acts that Jackson is no longer her boyfriend (because he never called her for a date), and so she was seeking a new, famous, talented, handsome boyfriend, such as Zac Efron or Justin Bieber. In 2013, Ballinger began a series of Miranda collaboration videos about "dating" YouTuber Joey Graceffa; an ongoing gag is that she cannot pronounce his last name. She has stated that the two are engaged, but she has accumulated several other boyfriends or "baes".

In 2009, Miranda proclaimed that she was not just a "triple threat" entertainer, but a "four threat", because she is also a model, as well as a singer/actor/dancer. Since 2010, she has asserted that she is a "five threat" talent, adding "magic" to her list of skills, and in videos she has combined inept magic tricks with singing. A regular part of her live comedy acts since 2010 includes a "magic trick" where Miranda sings while appearing to be stabbed through the neck by a sword. The joke is that she sings better when the sword is inserted through her neck. In 2012, Miranda Sings was one of the headliners at the Out of the Loop Fringe Festival, presented by WaterTower Theatre in Addison, Texas. A 2012 Miranda Birdland cabaret act was filmed by Seth Rudetsky.

=== Live comedy act, 2013 to present ===
As the popularity of the character increased, Ballinger was able to book longer sell-out runs of her live comedy acts at larger and larger venues including, in 2013, a six-performance run at the Leicester Square Theatre in London and theatres in Australia. In 2014, she expanded to larger theatres, beginning with the Best Buy Theater in New York City and, among other theatres, three shows in London's Cadogan Hall. A Buffalo, New York reviewer explained the shows' appeal: "Miranda's stage show – a quixotic blend of melodramatic pathos, lightning-speed wit and cultural literacy – is no mere ... reproduction of her Internet channel. It is as theatrical as it is musical, comedic as it is inspirational." A London reviewer concurred:

Miranda [is] hilarious, and I was struck on several occasions by what an accomplished creation the character is – with her own vocabulary, idiosyncrasies and bizarre (not to mention increasingly sinister) backstory, you've never seen anything like her, and the commitment with which Ballinger embodies this strange, strange girl is nothing short of admirable. Bridging both personas, the moment she transforms into Miranda, on-stage and mid-song, is an absolute joy – I'd struggle to recall hearing an audience erupt to such an extent, and I couldn't help but join in.

— BroadwayWorld reviewer Kevin Sherwin

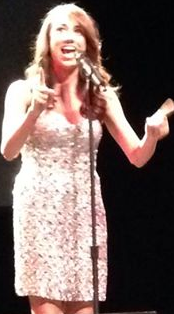
Ballinger begins a Miranda show as herself in 2014.

In her 2014 "Selp Helf" tour, she instructed her (mostly young, female) audience on how to get a boyfriend by being more Miranda-like. She did this, according to a reviewer, by demonstrating, in turn, the character's conception "of porn, bullies, love and 'haters' and transformed the subject matter into ... comical banter that relied heavily on audience participation ... she worked off everything the volunteers said and did, improvising and creating punchlines on the spot.". Another reviewer praised the "physical comedy. Miranda's alternative to twerking has to be seen to be believed and her recreation of her own birth ... was a hoot." The reviewer of the London Evening Standard wrote that the show "is deeper than it initially appears. ... She is funny and a strong role model, with a healthy disdain for pop’s oversexualisation. .... The satire is not exactly mindblowing but the message is undeniably positive. Plenty of interaction ... lends proceedings an inclusive feel ... when there was an appeal for volunteers almost every hand shot straight into the air." Ballinger gave Miranda shows in 57 cities in the tour.

Her spring 2015 tour was styled the "Miranda 4 Precident" [sic] tour; the concept was that Miranda was "born to be President" and was running for election again in 2015 "to help the whole world". Her 2015 "Summer Camp" bus tour of the US Midwest and East Coast featured ghost stories, a "bon fire", camp counsellors, merit badges, games and "friendship bracelets ... more of a variety show." It featured members of her family and friends. In September 2015, Miranda was a headliner at the Just for Laughs festival in Toronto, Ontario, Canada, and in December, Ballinger released a film version of one of her stage shows on Vimeo, titled Miranda Sings: Selp Helf. Reviewing Miranda's second engagement at the LaughFest festival in Grand Rapids, Michigan in 2016, a critic noted that the material "resonated with parents as well as the younger set." This echoed a review of her 2014 Edinburgh Fringe show, where her innuendo was described as being performed "in a way that will have parents laughing and children oblivious."

Among other appearances, Miranda performed at the Kennedy Center in April 2016 and in Nashville's Ryman Auditorium in May at the 3rd Annual Wild West Comedy Festival. During the second half of 2016, Ballinger toured Miranda shows in the US, England, Ireland, Germany and Denmark. A US tour in early 2017 and subsequent concerts were billed as "Miranda Sings Live! ... Your [sic] Welcome". The premise was that, finding it unfair that she will not be able to attend her own funeral, Miranda enacts a funeral celebrating her life, career, death and resurrection. She continued the tour in September with shows in Europe, Australasia and the US in late 2017 and early 2018. In her 2017–2018 shows, Miranda gave tips on "how to be famous". Her tour in mid-2018 was styled Miranda Sings Live ... No Offense, in which she argued that one can say anything, as long as they follow the statement with "no offense".

A Netflix comedy special, Miranda Sings Live... Your Welcome, filmed live at the Kennedy Center's Eisenhower Theater in Washington, D.C. in 2018, was released on June 4, 2019. Sara Aridi of The New York Times wrote: "Her peculiar sense of humor is the kind that simultaneously draws laughs and cringes – and it works." The same month, Ballinger began touring with her first post-baby Miranda show, "Who Wants My Kid?", in which Miranda tries to find a suitable audience member to take the "brat" she has been complaining about online. This tour continued throughout 2019 and into early 2020. BroadwayWorld called her 2022 Miranda show her "funniest one yet". Ballinger toured in early 2023.

In July 2023, Ballinger cancelled her remaining 2023 Miranda Sings tour dates following allegations of inappropriate conduct involving minors.

=== Haters Back Off ===
Miranda is the main character of a Netflix comedy series, Haters Back Off, co-developed by Ballinger (who stars as Miranda) and her brother Christopher Ballinger, about the beginnings of Miranda's career, her family life and her efforts to demonstrate her talents as she seeks fame. The series fills out the backstory implied in the Miranda videos, incarnating her spineless mother, Bethany (Angela Kinsey), and her overly devoted uncle Jim (Steve Little). It also introduced Miranda's best friend and neighbor, Patrick (Erik Stocklin), who has a crush on her; her younger sister, Emily (Francesca Reale), the normal family member who is treated as an outsider; and Miranda's estranged father Kelly (Matt Besser). Netflix released the first season in October 2016 and the second season in October 2017, after which it cancelled the series.

== Genesis of the character ==
Miranda's creator, Colleen Ballinger, based the character partly on young women that she knew in the performance department of her college, Azusa Pacific University. She told The Times of London, "There were a lot of cocky girls who thought they were really talented, and they ... were so rude and snotty, it drove me nuts. Then I saw all these girls trying to make a career out of putting videos on YouTube [of themselves singing in their bedrooms] ... clueless to the fact that they were terrible." Ballinger said: "I thought it was so stupid, because I didn't think anybody got famous off of YouTube." Also, when bored in choir class, Ballinger practiced singing slightly sharp or flat to amuse her friends. At first, the "Miranda videos were meant to be an inside joke" among Ballinger's friends. Ballinger's YouTube channel received little traffic for more than a year, but in March 2009, she uploaded a video called "Free Voice Lesson" that quickly became a sensation. The video consists of advice to use, and demonstrations of, techniques that real voice teachers would warn students to avoid, delivered in Miranda's arrogant, off-key way. Miranda's videos drew predictably sharp criticism on YouTube, as many viewers mistakenly believed the character was a real person, a "neo-Florence Foster Jenkins". As her videos became popular, Ballinger modified the character in response to the negative comments to make it more extreme, baiting the commenters by adopting the catchphrases "Haters Back Off" and "Haters Make Me Famous". "People would make fun of my hair, and I made it worse. ... I took what people hated and exaggerated it more in the next video."

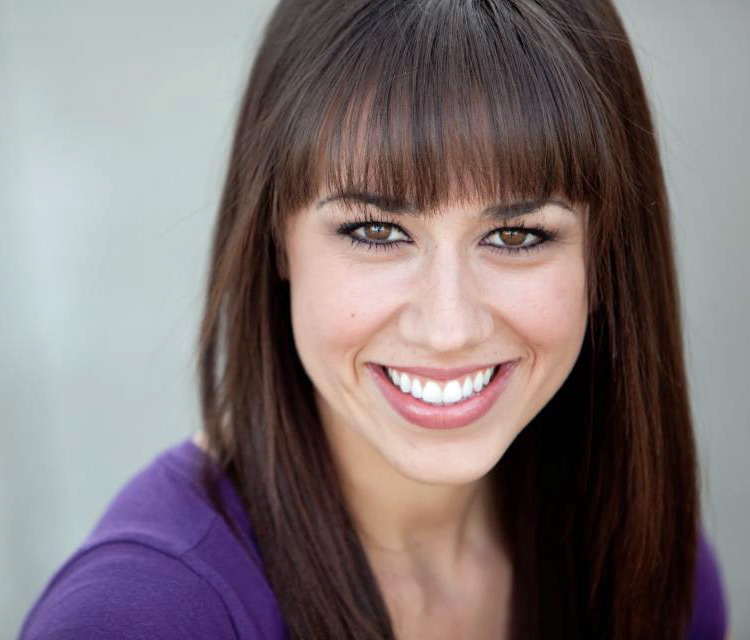
Colleen Ballinger, creator and alter ego of Miranda Sings, in 2012

Ballinger was briefly unsure of what to do with her newfound internet success, but in April 2009, Jim Caruso invited her to perform as the character at Cast Party, a weekly show at his Birdland jazz club in New York City. She recalls, "I went from making a minute-and-a-half video in my bedroom to doing an hour-and-a-half live show". Members of the Broadway theatre community quickly embraced the Miranda videos and were eager to be a part of Miranda's live comedy acts. Frankie Grande, who was then in the cast of Mamma Mia!, invited Ballinger to join the cast as Miranda at the Minskoff Theatre in the 2009 Broadway Cares Easter Bonnet competition charity benefit. Later, Broadway celebrities like Lin-Manuel Miranda performed in videos with Miranda. Ballinger was also invited to perform in London. At the Leicester Square Theatre in 2010, Miranda taught "voice lessons" to, and performed with, such West End theatre stars as Leanne Jones, Scarlett Strallen, Daniel Boys, Julie Atherton, Ian ‘H’ Watkins, Anna-Jane Casey, Jon Lee and Noel Sullivan, and the London casts of Naked Boys Singing, Wicked and Les Misérables. Since the summer of 2009, Miranda Sings has also been featured in radio, television and internet interviews where the interviewers explore the personality traits of, and play along with, the character.

The Miranda character receives negative comments to her videos from viewers who are fooled by the character and believe that they are watching a serious video by a bad entertainer. Ballinger told Backstage: "It's sort of like an Andy Kaufman thing. You wouldn't believe the hate mail. ... You would never say that stuff to someone's face, but you can type anything online." TheaterJones commented that "perhaps because the Internet is some crazy postmodern distortion of reality, people ... felt it was their duty to point out how woefully untalented [Miranda] was, in the most horrific ways. ... Her hate mail, which she reads some of on stage, is an art form all its own." Ballinger noted: "The whole reason Miranda went viral is because people were making fun of how stupid it was. If I didn't get hate mail, I wouldn't have a job." The online critics were so harsh that Miranda became a "hero of the anti-bullying movement". Her young fans find the character empowering because they see, perhaps selectively, "a conservatively attired girl who does what she likes, gets lots of attention and has bottomless self-esteem." Miranda also teaches that "Popular girls don’t have to be stylish. ... Fear no one. ... It's [acceptable for girls] to be cranky." An article at The Conversation observed that some YouTubers "use humour and satire to challenge ideas of popular femininity. ... Miranda Sings... puts on monstrous makeup to perform parody music videos [rejecting] being conventionally pretty." Fans of the character who are studying the performing arts say that Miranda is "a role model and a 'strong woman in comedy'" that inspires confidence in their performance and social skills.

The Times commented, "there is another, sweeter side to her travails. Miranda loves singing and, despite – or perhaps because of – the satire, becomes an evocation of something all humans love to do and have done since before we discovered language. The very act of singing, however dire the sound, makes us feel good." Ballinger noted that the TV show Glee (to which Miranda submitted an "audition" in 2010) is causing a resurgence of interest in singing in schools: "Everyone is talking about Glee and choirs and musical theatre, igniting a flame that has been dimmed for a long time. ... Live performance and musical theatre were almost a lost art ... people need to be reminded that it takes a lot more effort to sing than just watching movies or TV shows." Miranda followed up on this idea, saying: "Since I became so famous ... everyone is watching more music and singing more – because everyone wants to be more like me." As the Miranda character matured, its popularity grew especially with younger audiences of the Glee generation, with most of those attending her concerts being teenagers or in their twenties.

== Other activities ==
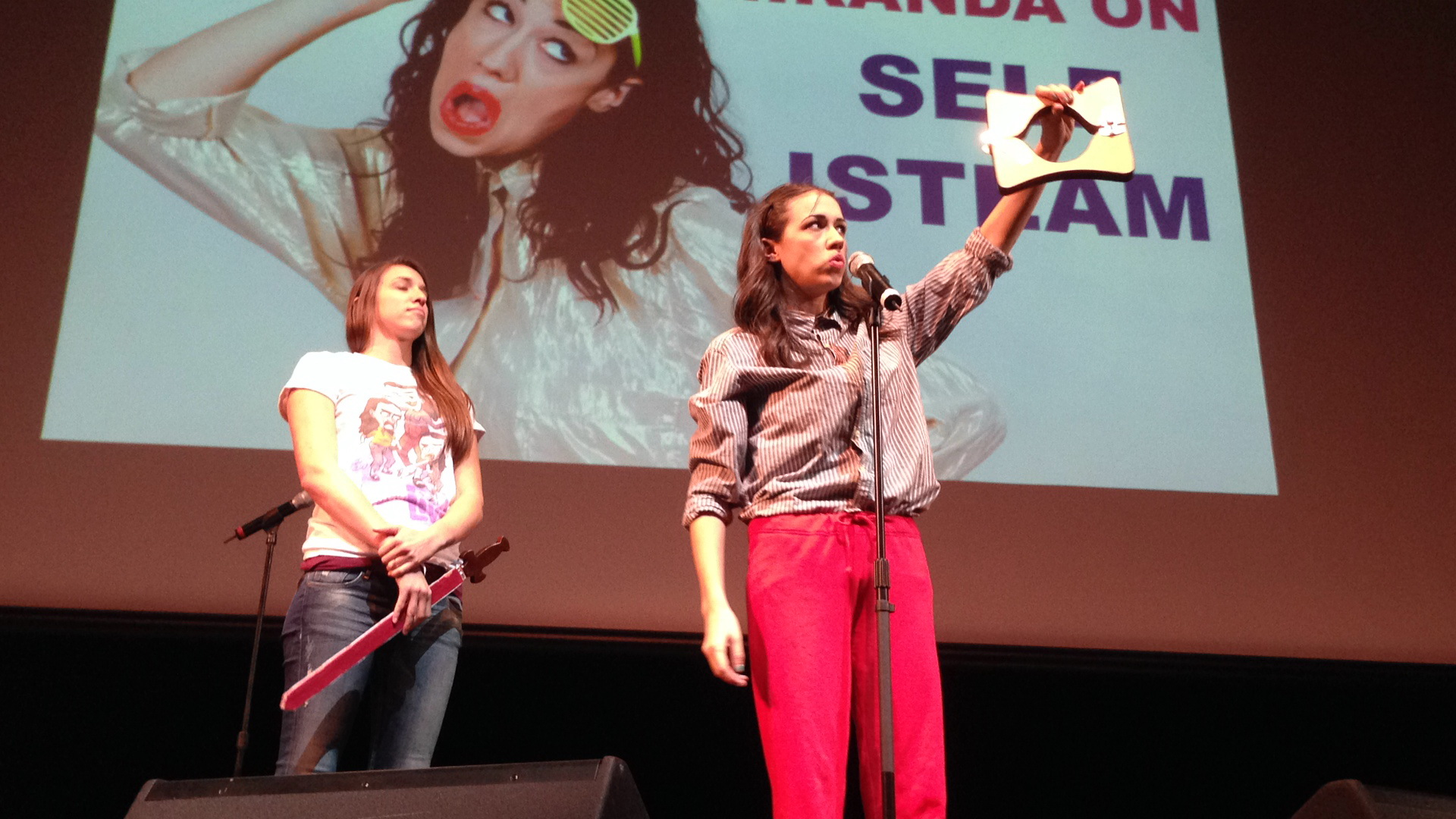
Magic trick: Miranda sings while being stabbed through the neck to boost her "self isteam", as noted on the projection behind her, 2014.

In 2009, Ballinger released a Christmas EP entitled "Christmas With Miranda Sings". In 2010, she appeared as Miranda at the Nightlife Awards, and Miranda was a presenter at the CYT Directors' Choice Awards in La Mesa, California. Later that year, at the Rose Center Theater, Miranda co-hosted a benefit concert, "Broadway Memories" (which included giving Sutton Foster a "voice lesson"), for the Alzheimer's Association and the Capistrano Center for the Performing Arts. The same year, Miranda appeared in an episode of the web series Apartment Red. From 2010 to 2012, Ballinger posted videos to another YouTube channel, Mirandavlogz, where Miranda vlogged, gave mock-tutorials, offered ridiculous opinions and participated in internet challenges like the cinnamon challenge. Miranda is heard in character on two tracks of the 2011 album Self Taught, Still Learning, by Chris Passey. The character also appeared in a 2012 comedy film, Varla Jean and the Mushroomheads.

Miranda Sings appeared in a Season 3 episode of the Nickelodeon television show Victorious, a one-hour special titled "Tori Goes Platinum", first broadcast on May 19, 2012. In the episode, Miranda is one of the auditioners for an awards show, singing "Freak the Freak Out". Also in 2012, she "interviewed" Nickelodeon star Jennette McCurdy and gave a "master class" at the Boston Children's Theatre. The character appeared in episode 6 of Dr. Fubalous, a 2012 web series. Later in 2012 Miranda vlogged that she was running for President of the US to offer an alternative to the candidates nominated by the major parties and offered a brief analysis of the presidential race. In another vlog, she laid out her campaign platform. She appeared in the first episode of Dance Chat in 2013, an Australian web show, and gave a free performance at the Community College of Rhode Island for the Charles Sullivan Fund for the Arts and Humanities. Miranda's commercial video collaborations include a 2014 back-to-school video for Old Navy, her 2016 video, "Sexy Buttery Love Song", for Jack in the Box restaurants and a 2018 Dunkin' Donuts promotion.

Miranda guest starred on the season 5 episode, "Happy Thanksgiving Miranda", of Comedians in Cars Getting Coffee with Jerry Seinfeld on the Crackle network in November 2014. Seinfeld called Miranda "a very well-developed character ... just as funny to me as ... to my daughter, who is 13. ... [The episode is] one of the best shows of Comedians in Cars we’ve ever done." Mediaite agreed, writing: "In its fifth season, Jerry Seinfeld's web series continued to be one of the most enjoyable weekly events on the internet. His experience with YouTube star Miranda Sings, which carried its way onto the Tonight Show, was a particular highlight." In December 2014, Miranda appeared on The Tonight Show Starring Jimmy Fallon playing Pictionary with Jimmy Fallon, Martin Short and Jerry Seinfeld. Us Weekly called the segment "the most hilarious game night ever". Entertainment Weekly called it "a riveting game", and People magazine wrote: "It's the most wonderful trainwrecked game of Pictionary you'll see this holiday season". In early 2015, she appeared in a music video for Lance Bass and on The Grace Helbig Show with Jim Parsons. Miranda was profiled in People magazine in June 2015. In June and July, Miranda and Ballinger (as herself) both starred in a six-episode beauty series parody, called How to Makeup, on the I Love Makeup YouTube channel operated by Collective Digital Studio.

In July 2015, "Miranda" released a book, Selp-Helf, published by Simon & Schuster, which calls it a "decidedly unhelpful, candid, hilarious 'how-to' guide". It contains 240 pages, in mock-scrapbook format, of photos and extensive artwork by Ballinger and her brother Christopher Ballinger, with Miranda's silly advice about such topics as love, finances, diet and exercise, and fashion. During pre-sales, Vanity Fair called Miranda "America's Newest Best-Selling Author". The book debuted at No. 1 on the Publishers Weekly Hardcover Non-Fiction best sellers list and The New York Times Best Seller list for Advice, How-To & Miscellaneous. It remained on the Times' Best Seller list for "Advice & Misc." for 11 weeks and was on their monthly Best Seller list for "Humor" through May 2016. Miranda released a hidden object game app, made by Games2win, called Miranda Sings vs Haters that was well reviewed and "topped iTunes USA charts in the week of December 3, [2015]". Ballinger appeared as Miranda as a guest star on the 2016 YouTube Red series Prank Academy. In 2016, Ballinger released a second Miranda Christmas EP, titled Hapy Holidays frum Miranda Sings. She released a second Miranda book in July 2018 titled My Diarrhe. It debuted at No. 8 on The New York Times Best Seller list for Advice, How-To & Miscellaneous.

In 2022 the character returned to television as a guest star on Episode 3 of the game show Generation Gap.

== Reception ==
Since early 2009, Ballinger's character has enjoyed widespread popularity, especially (initially) among musical theatre fans. Later, her fan base expanded particularly among teenagers. Her live comedy acts have been in demand at cabaret clubs and theaters in New York (Birdland Jazz Club, Best Buy Theater), London (Ambassadors Theatre; Leicester Square Theatre), Australia and elsewhere throughout North America, in the United Kingdom and Scandinavia, at venues where her mostly teenage fans, who call themselves "Mirfandas", are admitted.

In 2009, the Los Angeles Times wrote of her videos, "this footage is a major hoot", and BroadwayWorld.com described Ballinger as an "Internet Superstar." The Times of London commented that although Miranda's videos have made her "a darling of the Broadway musical-theatre scene ... [it] is not online but on stage that Miranda truly comes to ghastly life." In 2010, a BroadwayWorld review of Miranda's live comedy act said that Ballinger's "'Miranda Sings' persona is a very unique and original concept devised by a very creative imagination. ... Miranda is not to be missed. [As] the old saying goes, it takes talent to be that bad". Another commentator wrote similarly: "It's so awful, it's brilliant." Woman Around Town called Miranda "an atrocious, comedic masterpiece." Perez Hilton praised Miranda's parody of the hit song "Chandelier" as "the crowning achievement of music video parodies ... utterly fantastic". TheaterJones noted that Ballinger: "has hit on a character that reflects the zeitgeist of our time and does it with tongue firmly planted in cheek." In 2015, Playbill concluded: "Miranda Sings is a huge talent. With very demonstrative facial expressions, a unique take on makeup and wardrobe and her almost unbelievable vocal stylings, she cuts an undeniable figure in the world of online music video." The Guardian characterized Miranda's channel as "so bad it's great". Miranda has been compared with such absurd comic creations as Roseanne Roseannadanna and Andy Kaufman's characters, Kimmy Schmidt, "a distaff Napoleon Dynamite" and Pee-wee Herman.

In each of 2014 and 2015, Ballinger was nominated for a Teen Choice Award for "Web Star: Comedy" for her Miranda videos, winning the award in 2015. She was nominated for three 2015 Streamy Awards, winning one for best actress. She was also nominated for a 2015 People's Choice Award and a 2016 Shorty Award. She was nominated for a 2016 Streamy Award. A 2013 BroadwayWorld feature commented, "While [Miranda's] singing might not be anywhere near pitch-perfect, the character's comedic lampooning of self-aggrandizing divas surely is. ... [O]nly a truly talented performer could make the Miranda character believable, let alone as endearing as she ends up being." AussieTheatre.com stated: "Miranda ... creates the most successful parody of the world of YouTube ... she has created an international cult following". Real Detroit Weekly calls the character "delightfully hilarious". A reviewer from the Irish Independent wrote: "There is an endearing sweetness to her performance. ... This bizarre and bonkers show is somehow strangely compelling". The New York Times' review of Selp-Helf commented that Miranda's success stems from "milking the disconnect between her supreme confidence and her hopeless lack of ability ... endearing incompetence". One of the top 10 most-Googled fashion questions of 2015 was "How to dress up like Miranda Sings". Ballinger's success has, paradoxically, realized Miranda's supposedly misguided dreams. TV Guide commented: "Ironically, the character ... was created to satirize the very type of YouTube fame she's managed to cultivate." Newsweek's review of Miranda's YouTube satire of the 2019 James Charles/Tati Westbrook feud noted that although the character "rarely humanizes herself", she has the surprising ability to "make our heart hurt".

The Miranda Sings YouTube channel has received more than 2 billion views and has more than 10 million subscribers. In 2014, it was ranked No. 38 on New Media Rockstars' Top 100 Channels of All Time list, and in 2015, Miranda was listed as the 7th "most popular YouTube personality" by Daily American. Miranda was ranked No. 5 on Forbes magazine's 2017 list of top entertainment influencers. The most popular Miranda video, a parody cover of Taylor Swift's "Shake It Off", received more than 55 million views on YouTube in 2016 before the site removed it. Nine more of her videos have surpassed 20 million views, more than 35 of her videos have received over 10 million views, over 110 of her videos have received more than 5 million views, and more than 200 Miranda videos have received over 3 million views. The character also has more than 13 million followers on TikTok, 6 million followers on Instagram, 2.2 million followers on Twitter, and 1.6 million page likes on Facebook. BuzzFeed called her "The Queen of Twitter".
