= My Diarrhe =

2018 book by Colleen Ballinger

- Author: Colleen Ballinger
- Genre: Humor, Parody Biography
- Published: July 10, 2018
- Publisher: Gallery Books
- Publication place: United States
- Pages: 224
- ISBN: 9781501192166

My Diarrhe is a book by Colleen Ballinger, released July 10, 2018 by Gallery Books, an imprint of Simon and Schuster. It consists of supposedly leaked diaries written in the voice of the comic character Miranda Sings, which is created and performed by Ballinger.

The book debuted at no. 8 on The New York Times list of bestsellers (Advice, How To- & Miscellaneous category) a week after it premiered.
