= Westminster Rose Center =

Coordinates: 33.757°N 117.986°W

The Westminster Rose Center is a performing arts and entertainment complex located in Westminster, California. It is the home of the Vietnamese American Philharmonic Orchestra and TNT Productions. It has also served as the host to many touring Broadway productions, dance companies, opera troupes, and was the temporary home of the Academy for the Performing Arts during the renovations of Huntington Beach High School.

== History ==
Groundbreaking for the center occurred in April 2001 with the official grand opening on July 21, 2006, thus taking 5 years to accomplish the building process.

Originally named 'Westminster Community Cultural Center' on all city filed paperwork prior and during construction.

== Operation ==
The Rose Center Theater is operated by The Rose Center Foundation, a non-profit community volunteer group organized in 1999.

The Rose Banquet Center is operated by Crystal Rose Catering, a catering and event company with offices on-site.

Technical services for theatrical productions and banquet events is provided by The Backstage Supply Co. with offices on-site.

== Facilities ==
This 6,300-square-foot (590 m^{2}) facility is capable of hosting conferences, meetings, receptions, parties, dances, banquets and other social or corporate events. It also accommodates smaller parties in each of three rooms, when space is divided by portable walls, or up to 500 diners when it is opened to full capacity. Menus are created and prepared by an international chef and guests are treated to black-tie service. Each ballroom has facilities for wireless internet, audio connections, custom lighting, and video projection. A/V interconnects from the theater to the ballrooms enable overflow audiences or meeting groups to use both areas of the Rose Center seamlessly.

== Theater ==
The theater seats 419 plus disabled seating and provides a universal venue for every type of entertainment. By use of the curtains, the stage can be altered for solo performances, town hall meetings, large scale musical comedy productions, choral, orchestra, ballet and on stage weddings. Boxes on both sides of the stage on both upper and lower levels are utilized for musicians or for VIP seating. The backstage areas are fully equipped with lockers, showers, makeup and dressing areas.

Theatrical entertainment equipment includes modern lighting, audio, and video systems. The theater is a Proscenium style stage with traveling curtains and no vertical fly system. Over stage and above audience lighting and rigging positions are accessed through a stretch wire grid system. The lighting system encompasses 192 dimming circuits, networked wired and wireless DMX512-A data connections, ETC and Altman lighting instruments, Strand dimming and control systems. The audio system includes JBL and EAW speakers arranged in a left-right-center orientation, Allen and Heath mixing console, Shure wireless microphones, and a Peavey Media Matrix DSP. Video systems currently consist of LCD projection screen located upstage of the main curtain with VHS, DVD, VGA, Betacam SP, High-8, Mini-DV and universal BNC inputs.

== See also ==
- List of concert halls
- Rose Center Theater
