= Haters Back Off =

Comedy television series

- Official series artwork
- Genre: Comedy
- Created by: Colleen Ballinger; Chris Ballinger
- Based on: Miranda Sings by Colleen Ballinger
- Developed by: Colleen Ballinger; Gigi McCreery Perry Rein
- Starring: Colleen Ballinger; Angela Kinsey; Francesca Reale; Erik Stocklin; Steve Little
- Music by: Amotz Plessner
- Country of origin: United States
- No. of seasons: 2
- No. of episodes: 16

Production
- Executive producers: Colleen Ballinger; Chris Ballinger; Kristen Zolner; Ted Biaselli; Brian Wright; Josh Barry; Jeff Kwatinetz; Gigi McCreery; Perry Rein
- Producers: Arielle Bosivert; Shawn Williamson
- Production locations: Vancouver, British Columbia, Canada
- Running time: 23–36 minutes
- Production companies: McCreery-Rein; Brightlight Pictures; The Firm

Original release
- Network: Netflix
- Release: October 14, 2016 – October 20, 2017

Haters Back Off is an American comedy television series based on the YouTube character Miranda Sings created by Colleen Ballinger. Its two seasons were released on Netflix in October 2016 and 2017, respectively. The "surreal and absurd" series centers around the family life of Miranda Sings, a sheltered, self-absorbed, overconfident and untalented young performer who seeks fame on YouTube. The half-hour episodes depict Miranda's road to fame, and the price she pays for trampling on the feelings of others. The show stars Colleen Ballinger as Miranda, Angela Kinsey as her mother Bethany, Steve Little as her uncle Jim, Francesca Reale as her sister Emily, and Erik Stocklin as her best friend and love interest, Patrick. Season 2 added Matt Besser as Miranda's estranged father. Netflix described the show as "a bizarre family comedy, and a commentary on society today and our fascination with fame."

The series was created by Colleen Ballinger and her brother, Christopher Ballinger, together with showrunners Gigi McCreery and Perry Rein. It was produced by Brightlight Pictures. The show was named for Miranda Sings' signature catchphrase that she uses when responding to negative comments on her YouTube videos. Haters Back Off was one of the first scripted series created by a YouTube personality.

The first season was released on October 14, 2016. It follows Miranda from the time she uploads her first video until one of her videos goes viral. The second season was released on October 20, 2017. It concerns Miranda's schemes to raise money from fans, leading to her family's financial ruin and her 15 minutes of fame on a New York stage. Ballinger told Entertainment Weekly that the writers of Season 2 continued to craft the scenarios and plot points "from things that actually happened to me in my career". Netflix canceled the series after two seasons. Ballinger and Stocklin married in 2018.

== Background ==
=== Miranda Sings ===
Since 2008, Colleen Ballinger has posted videos as her comically talentless, narcissistic and quirky character, Miranda Sings, primarily on the YouTube channel Miranda Sings. The character is a satire of bad, but egotistical, performers who film themselves singing as a form of self-promotion. Miranda is portrayed as a home-schooled young woman who is eccentric and infantilized, narcissistically believes that she was born famous, and is obsessed with show business fame. Miranda uses spoonerisms and malapropisms, is irritable, ludicrously self-absorbed and self-righteous, socially awkward, and has a defiant, arrogant attitude. She responds to people who offer criticism with the catchphrase, "Haters back off!"

In March 2009, Ballinger uploaded a Miranda video called "Free Voice Lesson", full of awful singing advice, that quickly became her first viral sensation. This led to requests for Ballinger to perform live as Miranda, and she later began to tour worldwide. The Miranda Sings YouTube channel has received more than 2 billion views and has more than 10 million subscribers. Miranda has appeared in character on television shows, and Ballinger released a 2015 book, Selp-Helf, written in Miranda's voice, that ranked No. 1 on The New York Times Best Seller list for Advice, How-To & Miscellaneous. Her second Miranda book, My Diarrhe, appeared on the same best seller list in 2018.

=== Development ===
Ballinger told interviewers that she and her brother Chris began to develop the idea for the show about five or six years before it premiered. At first they considered a film treatment but later decided on a television series format. Ballinger chose Netflix over HBO to produce Haters Back Off because she felt that Netflix understood and was enthusiastic about the character and its online origin and fanbase. Comparing the show to Christopher Guest's Waiting for Guffman, showrunner Perry Rein said: "This is the first time we've done a show about a really bad dancer and singer. [It has] characters that take themselves very seriously in their very small worlds." The show was one of the first scripted series created by a YouTube personality.

On YouTube, Miranda always had an offstage relationship with her mother and uncle, and Ballinger long had the idea for Miranda's best friend, Patrick; these characters were first seen in Season 1 of the series, together with another new character, Emily, Miranda's sister. Ballinger said that she wanted to use the longer format of the series to expose Miranda's vulnerability and make her believable; to explain the source of the insecurities that make Miranda so rude and eccentric. Emily is the only normal person in Miranda's family, but they treat her as the odd one, like Marilyn in The Munsters. The series expanded Miranda's world seen in YouTube. Miranda represents an "extreme version of what the average gawky teenage girl may be feeling." Season 2 introduced Miranda's estranged father, played by Matt Besser.

/Film mused: "Haters Back Off seems like a smart move for Netflix. [A] streaming content provider seems like a natural fit. Her built-in audience is already used to watching original content online". TechCrunch commented: "[T]he rise of YouTube-fueled online influencers has been breathtaking ... building big audiences beyond the reach, knowledge and control of traditional entertainment gatekeepers, including the networks. ... Netflix can ... leverage the audiences of these online stars, and their marketing reach, to drive the fans to new properties ... online, where their fans already routinely seek entertainment". In September 2016, the series was included in The Wall Street Journal's list of "The 6 Best New Things to Stream in October". Bustle.com listed "11 Reasons You Should Watch ... Haters Back Off", writing that "Miranda has become emblematic of a new kind [of] star-seeker in the digital age: a youngster who decides that waiting for a fame-making opportunity simply won't do and that in order to become visible (and ostensibly beloved), you have to create the opportunities for visibility yourself."

== Cast ==
=== Main ===
- Colleen Ballinger as Miranda Sings, a talentless, egotistical, quirky, home-schooled young "want-to-be star"; in Season 2 Ballinger briefly also plays herself.
- Angela Kinsey as Bethany, Miranda's hypochondriac mother
- Steve Little as Jim, Miranda's enabling uncle and manager
- Erik Stocklin as Patrick Mooney, Miranda's best friend and neighbor
- Francesca Reale as Emily, Miranda's exasperated, voice-of-reason-and-normality sister
- Matt Besser as Kelly, Miranda and Emily's estranged father and Jim's brother (Season 2)

=== Recurring ===
- Chaz Lamar Shepherd as Keith, a local pastor (Season 1)
- Dylan Playfair as Owen Trent, the church choir's dreamy but narcissistic guitarist (Season 1)
- Harvey Guillén as Harvey, the manager and son of the owner of the fish shop (Season 1)
- Lindsay Navarro as Kleigh, Emily's friend (Season 1)
- Rachelle Gillis as April, Owen's girlfriend (Season 1)
- Mel Tuck as Old Man (Seasons 1 and 2)
- Simon Longmore as Dr. Schofele, Bethany's doctor (Seasons 1 and 2)
- Kara Hayward as Amanda (Season 2)

=== Guest stars ===
- Ben Stiller as himself (Season 1)
- John Early as Maureen, the Mattress Queen (Season 1)
- C. Ernst Harth as Taco Ta-Go Manager (Season 2)
- Joey Graceffa as himself (Season 2)
- Michael Bean as Gallery owner (Season 2)
- Frankie Grande as himself (Season 2)
- Lochlyn Munro as Brian Maxwell, a talent agent (Season 2)

== Production and promotion ==
Season 1 of Haters Back Off began filming in April 2016 in and around Port Coquitlam, British Columbia, near Vancouver, which substitutes, in the series, for Miranda's hometown, Tacoma, Washington. Filming on Season 1 wrapped on June 3, 2016. Ballinger began promotions for season 1 in January 2016 with a comic YouTube video announcement. Miranda was featured on the cover of Variety, and in a feature article about the show, in June 2016. Ballinger also promoted the show on her social media, including with an original song about it performed by Miranda. On September 1, 2016, Netflix released the first production stills from Season 1. On September 21, the show released its first of a series of teasers. Ballinger appeared on The Tonight Show on October 14, 2016, the release date, to promote the series.

Season 2 filmed in and around Vancouver from April until June 5, 2017. Ballinger began promotions for Season 2 in August 2017 with an appearance on Live with Kelly and Ryan. Ballinger announced the release date of Season 2 in character as Miranda on the Miranda Sings YouTube channel on September 11, 2017. On the same date, she released a new original song on Miranda's YouTube channel to promote the season. On October 10, 2017, Netflix released the official trailer for Season 2. On October 16, Angela Kinsey appeared on the Today show to promote the series, and three days later she was featured in a People video. The eight episodes of Season 2 were released by Netflix on October 20, 2017. On October 23, 2017, Ballinger returned to Live with Kelly and Ryan for a Halloween-themed show and appeared on The Tonight Show to discuss Haters Back Off. Two days later, Variety published a feature on Season 2. On October 30, Ballinger appeared as Miranda on Total Request Live, and the next day, she appeared again on Live with Kelly and Ryan. On January 2, 2018, Ballinger returned to Live with Kelly and Ryan to promote the show.

Netflix canceled the series after two seasons. Ballinger and Stocklin married in 2018.

== Episodes ==
=== Series overview ===
Season	Episodes	Originally released
1	8	October 14, 2016
2	8	October 20, 2017

=== Season 1 (2016) ===
No. overall	No. in season	Title	Directed by	Written by	Original release date
1	1	"Uploding my Fist Video"	Andrew Gaynord	Story by : Colleen Ballinger & Chris Ballinger; Teleplay by : Colleen Ballinger & Gigi McCreery & Perry Rein	October 14, 2016
Miranda and her adoring uncle Jim upload her first video, a tone-deaf cover of "Defying Gravity". This launches Jim's 5-phase plan for fame. Miranda is home-schooled by her single mom, Bethany, a hypochondriac who works as a grocery store cashier. Bethany indulges Miranda. In their cluttered little Tacoma, Washington, house, Miranda is alarmed to receive her first YouTube death threat. Miranda's best friend, Patrick, is smitten with her. He sells popsicles and gives her one every day from his bicycle cooler. Jim gets Miranda into a TV ad for his employer, a fish store, but the fish die under the hot lights set up for filming the ad. Patrick almost kills the store's owner by mistake before Miranda's exasperated sister Emily confesses to anonymously posting the death threat. Miranda is devastated by the betrayal but vows to keep seeking YouTube fame. Emily and Miranda agree to pretend in public that they are not sisters. Jim is fired from the fish store and decides to become Miranda's full-time manager. Miranda's video accumulates dozens of views, but more hateful comments arrive.
2	2	"Preeching 2 the Chior"	Andrew Gaynord	Justin Varava	October 14, 2016
Miranda uploads a tearful video titled "I Quit!". Jim begs her not to give up: after his high school ribbon dancing color guard performance went badly awry, he gave up his passion and lives a life of regret. At church, Bethany is attracted to the pastor, Keith; Miranda likes the choir's dreamy guitarist, Owen, and decides to join the choir. She is horrible to the choir, and they ask Keith to dismiss her. Patrick tries to console her, but she misunderstands his advice and vows to make Owen fall in love with her. Jim sells his car for $500. At the church singles night, the choir performs. Miranda interrupts and climbs onstage to sing a racy love song to Owen. When challenged, Miranda calls everyone a "hater". Pastor Keith asks Owen to remove Miranda, and Owen abandons her outside the church. Bethany advises Miranda not to let anyone stop her. Jim gives the $500 to the fish store manager to get his job back, but Miranda arrives and says that she is going back on the internet. Jim eagerly quits his job.
3	3	"Netwerking at the Nursing Home"	Andrew Gaynord	Russ Woody	October 14, 2016
Miranda uploads her cover of "Respect". Emily asks Miranda to sing for their aunt Moira, who is in a nursing home suffering from dementia. Miranda and Jim realize that, if Moira dies, Miranda might "get her stuff". Patrick rings the bell on his bicycle to give Miranda her daily popsicle. Bethany flirts with smooth-talking pastor Keith at the grocery store. At the nursing home, Miranda abandons Moira to meet Bob Hamburg, an old movie director spotted by Jim, hoping for an audition. Meanwhile, Patrick confronts Owen to find that Owen has no interest in Miranda. Miranda's singing kills Bob. Bob's nephew Ben Stiller asks Miranda to speak at the funeral, as she was "closest to" Bob when he died. Stiller notes that he is "in the industry", but Miranda doesn't want an "industrial job". At the funeral, instead of eulogizing Bob, Miranda begins to sing. Emily interrupts, and Miranda and Jim call Emily a jealous hater. Miranda uploads a new video, singing "Danny Boy".
4	4	"Rod Trip With My Uncle"	Todd Rohal	Colleen Ballinger & Chris Ballinger	October 14, 2016
Pastor Keith has been dating Bethany since the funeral. He offers to get Miranda a singing gig at the prestigious Thea Foss Theatre. Jim is jealous and says he has a better gig at a venue in Seattle. Although Jim is unable to book a theatre, he drives Miranda and Patrick (as their roadie) to Seattle, as Miranda chooses a stage name: "Miranda Sings". Jim spots a karaoke bar and says that the gig is there. On the elevated stage, Miranda is worried the audience will see up her skirt, so Jim lends her his red sweatpants. Meanwhile, Emily grows suspicious that Keith has a fetish for sick people. Patrick phones Emily to ask for a ride home. Miranda sings "All That Jazz" at the Karaoke competition, but Patrick's bubble machine makes the stage slippery, and hysteria ensues. Emily, Bethany and Keith arrive to see the debacle. Keith proposes to Bethany, but she declines: her family needs her more. Miranda, Jim and Patrick win the competition as a comedy trio, but Miranda is angry: she is a solo singing act! Jim happily picks up the $100 prize.
5	5	"Staring in a Musicall"	Todd Rohal	Gigi McCreery & Perry Rein	October 14, 2016
Bethany edits Miranda's dance video cover of "Genie in a Bottle" and suggests that they do a home production of Annie. Jim forcefully takes over as director, planning to tape the performance for Broadway producers. Finding that Daddy Warbucks is Annie's love interest in this version of the musical, the actor cast in the part quits in disgust. Patrick takes the role, as he has memorized all of Warbucks' lines; he looks forward to his stage kiss with Miranda as Annie. Bethany calls a plumber, who determines that the toilet in Jim's room has leaked raw sewage into the back yard, where the cast is rehearsing. The musical is shut down. Emily is embarrassed when her friend Kleigh discovers that Emily has been lying about not being Miranda's sister.
6	6	"Becuming a Magichin"	Andrew Gaynord	Justin Varava & Russ Woody	October 14, 2016
Miranda makes a video tutorial: "Free Voice Lesson". Jim thinks it will be a hit, but Miranda refuses to upload it, as it gives away her vocal secrets. Patrick is excited about his upcoming audition at a magic club. Miranda is impatient to get famous, so Patrick offers to teach her some magic and let her audition in his place with a spectacular trick, the magic sword cabinet! He will be her assistant. Miranda notices Patrick's romantic artwork made from her many popsicle sticks. Emily is still depressed; she paints alone in the garage. Jim, unable to occupy his room until the plumbing is fixed, moves in with Bethany, to her disgust. Bethany wanders backstage at the magic auditions, but her presence there would disqualify Miranda. Before Bethany can flee, stagehands come, and she hides in the magic cabinet, which they wheel onstage. Patrick is surprised to meet Bethany inside the cabinet. Miranda sticks in the swords, and Patrick helps Bethany avoid getting stabbed, until Miranda goes off script, and both Bethany and Patrick are wounded. At the hospital, Bethany's doctors find a kidney abnormality, as Miranda watches over Patrick.
7	7	"Starr off the Parade"	Andrew Gaynord	Gigi McCreery & Perry Rein	October 14, 2016
Miranda uploads a cover of "Love Shack". Patrick finally asks Miranda on a date, but she says she would only marry a famous person, since she is famous. The doctors tell Bethany that her kidneys are failing. Emily wants to move away to an art school. Jim tries to get Miranda on the Grand Marshal's float in the upcoming town parade. When rebuffed, Jim decides to form a color guard of home schoolers to march with Miranda in the parade, led by Jim as ribbon dancer. Patrick builds the "home schooled" float around his ice cream bicycle; it looks like a huge Uncle Jim pony. Miranda rides aboard it in a pink cowboy hat. Jim's color guard performs beautifully, but his pyrotechnics light the float on fire just as Miranda kisses Patrick inside it and agrees to go on a date with him. At her art school admission panel, Emily discovers that Miranda has altered Emily's portfolio by gluing macaroni, felt and sparkles to her artworks, ruining them.
8	8	"i'm famous"	Andrew Gaynord	Colleen Ballinger & Chris Ballinger	October 14, 2016
Miranda forbids Jim to post the "Free Voice Lesson" video. Owen asks her to perform at his CD release party/show at Thea Foss Theatre. Bethany's kidney disease worsens. As Miranda ruined her art school admission, Emily goes to live with their father. Owen asks Miranda to hold a diamond ring for a "big surprise" announcement. Miranda thinks he is proposing to her and puts on the ring; she coldly cancels the elaborate date that Patrick has planned. Jim posts the voice lesson video to YouTube; Miranda fires him. On stage she sings "I Will Always Love You" to Owen, who stops her, saying it is a joke. He proposes to April, pulling the ring off of Miranda's finger. The audience starts laughing, and Miranda asks: "Why is it funny that someone would love me?" They fall silent. She lunges for the ring and is forced out into the pouring rain. No one will take her calls. Arriving drenched at home, she yells at Bethany, who failed to attend because of her kidney medication. Bethany needs a kidney donor or she will die. She leaves Miranda alone in the house. Miranda is about to delete "Free Voice Lesson", but sees that it has over 100,000 views and many positive comments. Her moment of triumph is a moment of great loneliness. She hears a bell and looks up hopefully.

=== Season 2 (2017) ===
The second season has 8 episodes, bringing the total number of episodes to 16.

No. overall	No. in season	Title	Directed by	Written by	Original release date
9	1	"im gunnna be an legend"	Brian Dannelly	Colleen Ballinger & Chris Ballinger	October 20, 2017
Miranda looks outside, but Patrick is not there; she is lonely and ill-equipped to live alone. She soon finds Uncle Jim living in the van in the driveway and tells him the video has gone viral; he forgives her, and she asks him back as her manager. Miranda has received an offer to come to Mr. Crusoe's "Wrap Party" on Broadway in New York City. She and Jim are detained trying to sneak onto a plane to New York, but Patrick arrives to forgive Miranda and resume his job as roadie. Meanwhile, Bethany has been staying at a motel. She tours the Bible Adventure Museum and realizes, "my daughter needs me". She goes to see Emily.
10	2	"Getting Condomsated 4 My Ad"	Brian Dannelly	Justin Varava	October 20, 2017
Uncle Jim and Miranda are shocked to see a taco shop's commercial banner on Miranda's next YouTube video, "Poker Face". Jim has a new 5-phase plan for "becoming a legend": get paid for the ad, sell merchandise, open a theme park, buy a bank and fly to Broadway. He, Miranda and Patrick start an abortive protest against the taco shop. Bethany asks Emily to return home because her father, Kelly, is "not a good man". Kelly and Bethany are separated (he does not wish to divorce for tax reasons), but he claims that Bethany owes him alimony. Emily feels sorry for Bethany, and the two return to the prodigious mess that Miranda has left in their house. Bethany tells Miranda that the way she treats people is "not OK".
11	3	"Exposing My Impostr"	Steven Tsuchida	Gigi McCreery & Perry Rein	October 20, 2017
A young girl has been copying Miranda's act online. Miranda's rival is a fan who plans to perform as Miranda at a middle school talent show. Emily tries to get Bethany to adopt healthier habits, and Bethany's doctor approves. Miranda, Jim and Patrick trap the girl in a bathroom while Miranda goes onstage. Patrick wheels out the bound girl, to the confusion of the audience. Emily tries to free the girl, but Miranda tackles her. Bethany arrives and, astonishingly, asserts herself, defusing the situation. Just then, Bethany falls ill and collapses.
12	4	"Modelling at the Hospital"	Steven Tsuchida	Gigi McCreery & Perry Rein	October 20, 2017
Patrick delivers Miranda's first YouTube advertising revenue check to her in Bethany's hospital room, for $40.22: Phase 1 completed! When the check is accidentally destroyed, Uncle Jim gets a twisted idea for a line of Miranda merchandise: free hospital gowns with Miranda's face silkscreened on them. The merchandise is not selling, so Patrick proposes a fashion show featuring the line. Bethany needs a new kidney, and Emily offers to donate one, but she is not a match. Emily interrupts Miranda's fashion show to relate this, and Miranda surprises her by donating her own kidney. Miranda, recovering from surgery, tells Patrick that she loves him; he kisses her; they both vomit. A nurse makes the unsettling observation that Bethany and Jim "make a cute couple".
13	5	"my 1rst bae"	Benjamin Berman	Colleen Ballinger & Chris Ballinger	October 20, 2017
Patrick happily watches Miranda's new "Garage tour" video; he recalls their first meeting as children. The romantic vibe between Bethany and Jim makes things awkward around the house. YouTube star Joey Graceffa's tour is coming to Tacoma, and Jim says that Miranda needs to become part of a celebrity power couple with him. Things were going well with Patrick, but Miranda sees him talking with a girl, Amanda, and she misunderstands. When the family briefly treats Emily nicely, she is creatively blocked, but after a confrontation with Miranda, Emily paints furiously. Miranda meets Joey Graceffa and throws herself at him; Patrick wants to intervene, but Jim points out that Joey can help Miranda get "the fame she deserves". Patrick leaves, Joey rejects Miranda, and Miranda goes home to cry; Emily offers heartfelt condolences. Amanda invites Patrick on a LARP date.
14	6	"makeen the news"	Benjamin Berman	Justin Varava	October 20, 2017
In Miranda's new video she sings The Queen of the Night's aria. Emily walks in on Jim and Bethany having their first date in the bathroom. Patrick resigns as roadie; he and Miranda still think the other was unfaithful. Miranda, Bethany and Jim begin to create a theme park, Miranda World. Miranda and Jim are excited when Kelly comes by the house, but he is there to take Emily away to meet a gallery owner about giving Emily a show. He also presses Bethany for alimony. The gallery owner is not interested in Emily's paintings. Patrick and Amanda enjoy their LARP date. Bethany and Jim share a first kiss at the store where she works. Patrick and Amanda go to the store, followed there by a jealous Miranda, who causes bedlam. Bethany is fired from her job, and they return home to find an eviction notice. Kelly and Emily clear out the garage to set up a gallery there.
15	7	"my theem park"	Steven Tsuchida	Gigi McCreery & Perry Rein	October 20, 2017
Jim and Bethany work to keep Miranda from learning about their romance. As Kelly and Emily ready the gallery in the garage, Miranda World opens to the public in the front yard. Patrick and Amanda arrive, and Miranda alternates between control freak and crazed jealousy. Amanda reveals that Patrick did not cheat on Miranda, but Patrick cannot forgive Miranda and leaves. Kelly's wealthy hippie connections are not coming through, and Emily begins to see Kelly's bad character. Miranda learns about Jim and Bethany; she is devastated about that and about Patrick. Kelly suggests to Miranda that they "leave these losers behind", and they agree to go to New York, taking the money from Miranda World with them, as Emily's gallery is ruined.
16	8	"broadway or buts"	Steven Tsuchida	Colleen Ballinger & Chris Ballinger	October 20, 2017
Miranda and Kelly tape a rooftop promo, as eviction looms for the family in Tacoma. Mr. Crusoe clarifies that the invitation was merely for Miranda to attend "Wrap Party". Patrick and Amanda have another medieval-themed date, as Emily melts down from Kelly's betrayal. At Birdland Theatre, Miranda climbs onstage to interrupt the last act, Frankie Grande. She brutally insults his singing, and the audience thinks it is a brilliant comedy act. Grande and Crusoe invite Miranda to appear in further Broadway performances. Kelly is proud. Miranda's triumph receives mixed reactions at home. Patrick tries to make Amanda more Miranda-like; she flees. On a TV talk show, Miranda insults the host; another fail! Her agent and Kelly agree that to salvage her fame they must hire an actress to play the person behind her "act". Miranda storms out and returns sadly to Tacoma. Kelly is there; he viciously bullies her. The family overhears this, and Jim punches Kelly, who leaves. The family was evicted, but they moved upstairs to the tiny attic crawlspace. Miranda and Patrick sweetly reconcile. On TV, Colleen Ballinger plays "the actress behind Miranda Sings"; Miranda is appalled.

== Reception ==
The first season of Haters Back Off received mixed reviews from critics. On Rotten Tomatoes, the season has a rating of 50%, based on 20 reviews, with an average rating of 4.67/10. The site's critical consensus reads, "Haters Back Off is bizarre, painful, and often times excruciatingly funny – yet the appeal of the YouTube transport doesn't quite carry over in the longer television format." On Metacritic, the season has a score of 54 out of 100, based on 9 critics, indicating "mixed or average reviews". The show debuted as the 2nd most popular digital original series in the US for the week of October 14–20, 2016. It won the "Best Comedy" award at the 2016 CelebMix Awards.

Positive reviews of Season 1 include Robert Lloyd's in the Los Angeles Times, who observed that, unlike in Miranda's YouTube videos, the character's actions in the TV series have consequences and affect the other characters and their feelings. Lloyd thought that the series succeeds in "shaping a funny idea into a semblance of life". He praised the performances, especially Kinsey's. The Guardian printed two positive reviews: Brian Moylan called the series a "hilarious transfer to Netflix. ... Ballinger gets at something that is not only a cultural critique but often hits on the fragility of egos and everyone's need for acceptance." In their other review, Stuart Heritage wrote: "It's a uniformly singular sitcom about the effects of fame, and frequently a very funny one. ... [I]t is great, once you've attuned yourself to its quirks". Melanie McFarland, on NPR, compared Miranda's world with Pee-wee Herman's, saying that both are "perversely funny, cartoonish worlds that also manage to be weirdly innocent. 'There's just that sly element of wrongness about it that makes it oh so right.'" Daniel D'Addario wrote in Time magazine that the series "is imperfect, but it's also more than it needed to be. ... Ballinger examine[s] what the obsession with having fans papers over and the new problems it creates." Paste magazine ranked Haters Back Off as the 9th "best new Netflix Original Series of 2016". Jon O'Brien later wrote for Metro:

Even if you're not particularly a fan of Miranda Sings ... there's still plenty to enjoy about Haters Back Off. Little is wonderfully absurd as the uncle almost as deluded as Miranda herself, while Reale elicits genuine sympathy as the only "normal" character regularly bulldozed by her sister's ambition. And by combining the strange small-town suburbia of Napoleon Dynamite and cartoonish antics of Pee-wee Herman, the show remains one of Netflix's most wonderfully weird originals.

TheWrap's Michael E. Ross called the series an "antic, sometimes wise, often laugh-out-loud funny case of art imitating life imitating art", noting that "there are times ... when the veneer of ego is stripped away, and we discover the shy, insecure young woman behind the bluster. Haters reflects a hearty sense of humor about the genesis of online celebrity. ... [W]hat resonates ... is Miranda's underlying humanity, her basic drive to be recognized, to stand apart from the crowd. And we can all relate to the pain of rejection". Jasef Wisener of TVOvermind.com gave the series 3.8 stars out of 5. He was favorably impressed by the character development and the performances, especially Ballinger's and Reale's. He also liked its structure and musical score, but felt that the exposition was sometimes bogged down in the early episodes by its explanation of details and sometimes panders to Miranda's established internet audience; he felt that the series improves in the later episodes. He disliked the sexual innuendos and found Miranda's relationship with Uncle Jim uncomfortable, although these are elements carried over from Miranda's YouTube videos. The A.V. Club's Danette Chavez commented that Ballinger's "portrayal of Miranda is multidimensional in spite of the character's single-mindedness. ... Haters fleshes out the environment that would spawn such an egotistical personality. ... [L]aughs are as consistently delivered" with zany comedy, although the "domestic strife and even anguish" makes the series nearly a dramedy. But she felt that "sometimes the foreshadowing is just a little too foreboding. ... the tonal shifts don't always jibe."

In a mixed review for New York magazine's Vulture site, Jen Chaney judged that "not everything in Haters Back Off! works. ... If you find Miranda Sings irritating after watching a two-minute YouTube clip, you should find something else to put in your queue. But ... fans ... who have a reasonable amount of patience will likely find some redeeming qualities to latch onto, especially as the episodes progress. ... Miranda is a purposely maddening character. But Ballinger commits to her so fully and with such specific physicality ... that she's often mesmerizing to watch. ... [But] maybe Miranda Sings is better in shorter doses." Similarly, for The New York Times, James Poniewozik wrote that:

Like Miranda's performances, Haters can be terrible and transfixing at the same time. ... Ballinger commits to Miranda's hunger and histrionics. ... There's a deeper pathos to Miranda's situation, but the season doesn't delve deeply into that until late, by which time haters will have long since backed off. ... There's a lot in Haters Back Off! to gratify Ms. Ballinger's YouTube fan base. ... Beyond the winces, there's something human in its comedy of internet thirst: the insatiable drive to put a piece of oneself out into the world and hit refresh, refresh, refresh.

Brian Lowry, writing for CNN, had a mostly negative reaction. He felt that while the series' "critique of a fame-obsessed culture certainly has merit", and that the later episodes "reward patience", the show was too "cartoon-like", and "there's a sense that the series is stretched beyond what it has to offer." Keith Uhlich, in The Hollywood Reporter, found the gags funny, but he concluded that although Miranda is "an acidic critique of the very celebrity strivers who make up the majority of the YouTube community", it is more effective "in short bursts". In "an eight-episode Netflix series ... the lampoon loses its edge". He also thought that much of the pathos in the series is "unearned, unconvincing" and the characters are "shallow vessels freighted down by contrived plot complications . ... And there's more than a bit of that vainglorious YouTubers' entitlement in where Haters ultimately ends up, the satire finally curdling into smugness." Sonia Saraiya of Variety did not think that the series has "the same organic appeal as Ballinger's bizarre, pastiche-y videos. ... Miranda lacks some of the innocent naivete that makes her character work on YouTube. ... Miranda's behavior ... could be raucously hilarious [for some viewers], an example of theater-geek self-obsession run amok. For me, anyway, Miranda's obsessions and absorptions ... prove to be more tragic than hilarious." Rob Lowman of the Los Angeles Daily News wrote: "The series seems to want to exist somewhere between a Pee-wee Herman world, where Miranda exists within her own reality, and Waiting for Guffman or other parodies of self-important clueless people. It doesn't succeed as either, nor on its own terms."
