= Man Camp (film) =

- Directed by: Nate Bakke
- Written by: Daniel Cummings; Scott Kruse; Josh Long
- Produced by: Scott Kruse
- Starring: Daniel Cummings; Scott Kruse; Erik Stocklin; Tammy Kaitz; Pete Gardner
- Cinematography: Alex Parker
- Edited by: Jonathan Melin
- Music by: John Baxter
- Production company: Tangled Leash Films
- Distributed by: Gravitas Ventures
- Release dates: 24 October 2019 (Austin Film Festival); 21 April 2020 (digital)
- Running time: 94 minutes
- Country: United States
- Language: English

Man Camp is a 2019 American comedy film directed by Nate Bakke, starring Daniel Cummings, Scott Kruse, Erik Stocklin, Tammy Kaitz and Pete Gardner.

== Cast ==
- Daniel Cummings as Adam Mann
- Scott Kruse as Tim Mann
- Erik Stocklin as Kevin Mann
- Tammy Kaitz as Theresa Mann
- Pete Gardner as Alan
- Raleigh Cain as Christy Borders
- Anna Rubley as Katie Mann

== Release ==
The film was released on several streaming services on 21 April 2020.

== Reception ==
Michael Walsh of Nerdist gave the film a rating of 3.5/5 and called it a "well-acted comedy that also doubles as a touching family story about grief, growing up, and moving on."

Alan Ng of Film Threat gave the film a score of 6.5/10 and wrote that while he found the comedy "humorous", it was "rarely laugh out loud funny".

Allen Adams of The Maine Edge called the film a "shaggy, silly good time that also offers a surprising amount of heart."
