= Colleen Ballinger =

American comedian and social media personality (born 1986)

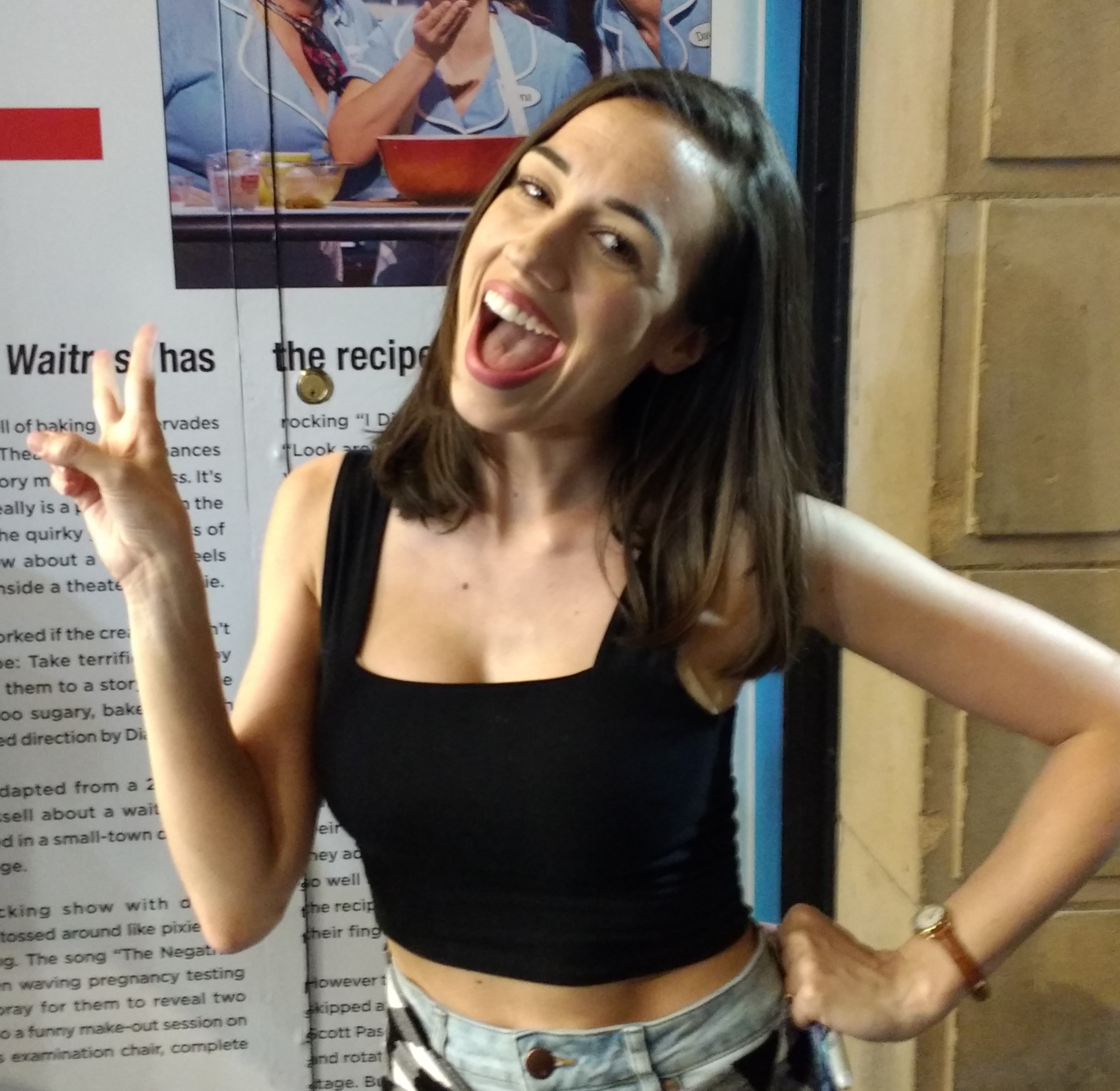
- Ballinger in 2019
- Born: Colleen Mae Ballinger; November 21, 1986 (age 39); Santa Barbara, California, U.S.
- Occupations: Comedian; YouTuber; actress; singer; writer
- Years active: 2008–present
- Spouses: Joshua Evans (m. 2015; div. 2016) Erik Stocklin (m. 2018)
- Children: 3

YouTube information
- Channels: Colleen Ballinger; Miranda Sings; Colleen Vlogs
- Genres: Comedy; vlogging
- Views: 5.1 billion

Colleen Mae Ballinger (/ˈbælɪndʒər/ BAL-in-jər; born November 21, 1986) is an American comedian, YouTuber, actress, singer and writer. She is best known for her creation and portrayal of the Internet character Miranda Sings, posting videos of the character on YouTube, performing her one-woman comedy act on tour in theatres worldwide, and creating and starring in a Netflix original series titled Haters Back Off (2016–2017). Ballinger created the comically talentless, egotistical and eccentric character to satirize the many YouTube videos featuring people singing badly in hopes of breaking into show business but who appear unaware of their lack of talent.

Ballinger also features comedy and lifestyle videos on her personal YouTube channel and a vlog channel, Colleen Vlogs. Her YouTube channels, combined, have surpassed 5 billion total views. The Miranda Sings channel has more than 10 million subscribers, and the character has more than 13 million TikTok followers and 6 million Instagram followers. In 2015, Ballinger won a Teen Choice Award for "Web Star: Comedy" and a Streamy Award as Best Actress.

Ballinger has appeared as an actress and singer in theatre, television, recordings and web series. She appeared in the web series Escape the Night (2018–2019), played Dawn in the Broadway musical Waitress (2019), and has appeared three times on The Tonight Show (2016–2017), among other talk shows. Ballinger has also published two best-selling books, written in Miranda's voice, Selp-Helf (2015) and My Diarrhe (2018).

In July 2023, Ballinger cancelled her forthcoming live shows following allegations of inappropriate conduct. She continues to vlog and host podcasts.

== Early life ==
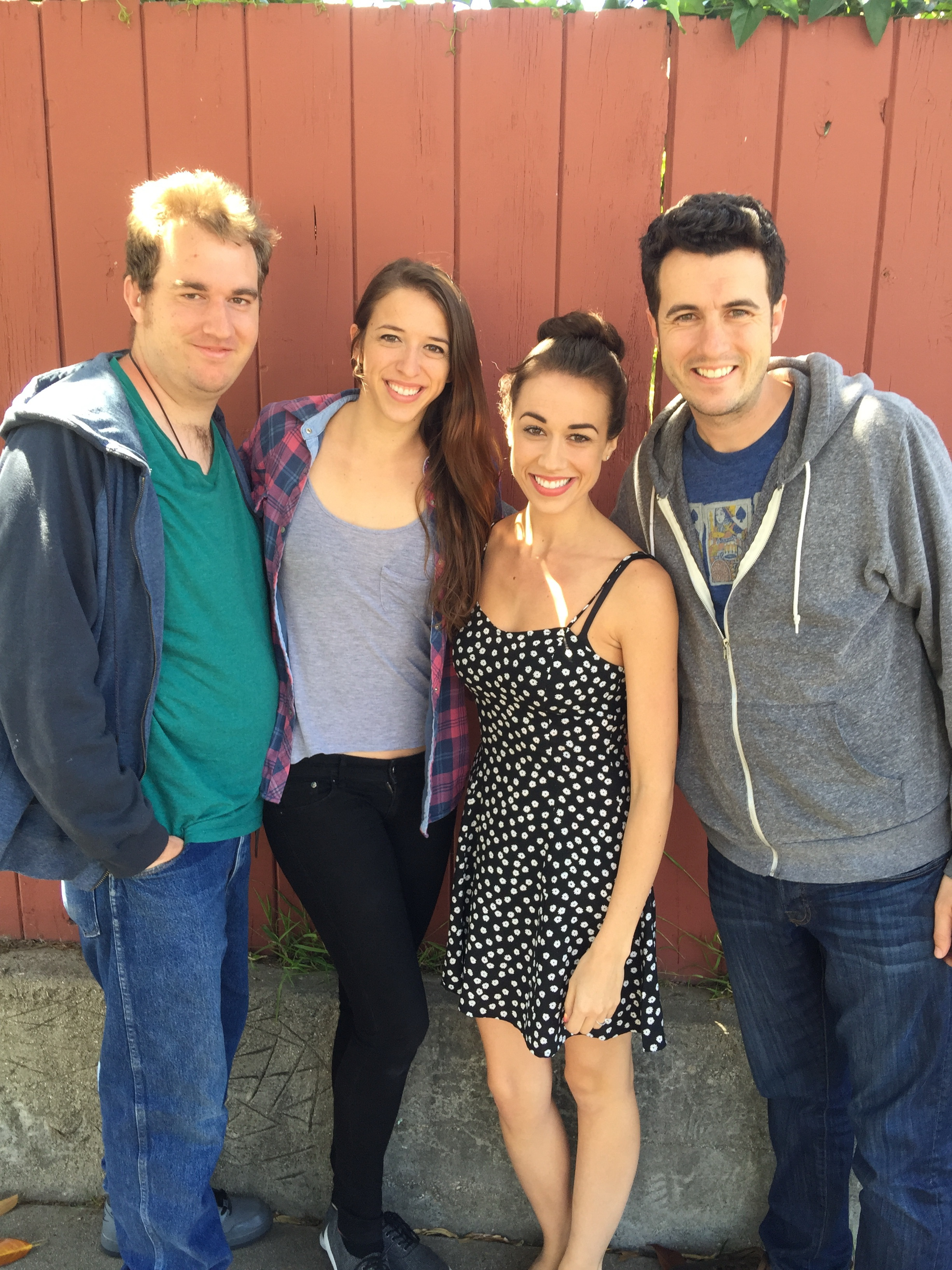
All four Ballinger siblings, from left: Trent, Rachel, Colleen and Chris, in 2015

Colleen Mae Ballinger was born and raised in Santa Barbara, California, the daughter of Tim Ballinger, a sales manager, and his wife Gwen (née Trent), a homemaker. Ballinger was homeschooled during middle school, attended San Marcos High School and graduated in 2008 from Azusa Pacific University, where she majored in vocal performance. She has two older brothers, Christopher and Trent, and a younger sister, Rachel.

== Career ==
=== Acting career ===
From 2007 to 2009, Ballinger performed at Disneyland in California; gave private voice, movement coaching and piano lessons to children; and performed at parties and cabaret spaces. In 2009, she played Kelsi Nielsen in High School Musical at Candlelight Pavilion Dinner Theatre in Claremont, California. Ballinger appeared on the 2010 album More With Every Line, by songwriter Tim Prottey-Jones, and the 2011 album Self Taught, Still Learning by Chris Passey. In New York in 2011, she played Lynda Bird Johnson in a staged reading of First Kids and created the role of Circe in the American Theatre of Actors Off-Broadway production Odyssey – The Epic Musical.

In 2012, Ballinger was featured as nurse Royal in the web series Dr. Fubalous. She also gave a talk at the Boston Children's Theatre about how to use social media to promote yourself as a performer. In 2013, she starred in the episode "Under the Bed" in the web series The Flipside and as Amara in episode 9 of season 2 of the web series Hipsterhood. She plays Meg on the Volume 12 DVD of Family Guy in the live-action version of the show's introduction. Also in 2013, she was featured on the MTV True Life episode "I'm Famous Online". In 2014, she appeared in the episode "Wedding Plans!" on the web series MyMusic.

Ballinger was a guest co-host on The View in 2015. The same year, she was interviewed on the podcast RuPaul: What's the Tee?, starred in a Todrick Hall video, "Beauty and the Beat Boots", and appeared in the Season 2 finale of the Condé Nast Entertainment webseries #HeyUSA, with host Mamrie Hart. Later that year, both as herself and as Miranda Sings, Ballinger starred in a six-episode beauty series parody called How to Makeup on the I Love Makeup YouTube channel operated by Collective Digital Studio. In this show, "Colleen has fantastically found a way for guys to become interested in a makeup show ... there's a plot". Re/code featured Ballinger to exemplify "an emerging economy" of internet content providers. She is featured on the track "Clouds" in Flula Borg's 2015 EP, I Want to Touch You.

Ballinger appeared in a series of 2016 DiGiorno pizza commercials. In 2018, she appeared as The Disco Dancer in season 3 of the web series Escape the Night, in a cameo role in the animated film Ralph Breaks the Internet, and in the Ariana Grande music video "Thank U, Next". She appeared as The Duchess in season 4 of Escape the Night (2019). She made her Broadway debut in the musical Waitress, as Dawn, where she appeared from August to September 2019. The week of Ballinger's debut, box office grosses for the musical increased by $358,783 to $938,087, and they continued to rise, reaching $963,408 the following week. On Halloween 2020, Ballinger played Janet in a livestream reading of The Rocky Horror Picture Show, starring original cast members Tim Curry, Nell Campbell and Barry Bostwick.

In 2021, Ballinger voiced the role of Crandy on the Netflix animated series Centaurworld.

=== Comedy act and videos ===
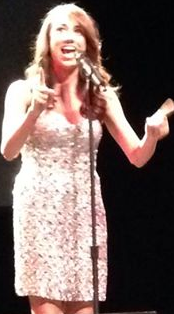
Ballinger opening her act as herself, in 2014, before transforming into Miranda

In 2009, Ballinger began to make a living by performing her live one-woman comedy act in character as Miranda Sings. She continued to tour thereafter and stated that, of all her professional activities, she gets the most satisfaction in her career from her live performances. In addition to her Miranda tours, Ballinger toured with her then-husband, singer and fellow YouTuber Joshua David Evans, in music and comedy shows in December 2015 and January 2016 across the US as "The Colleen & Josh Show".

Ballinger displays more than 2,000 videos on her YouTube channels. Her personal channel features comedy, question and answer videos, YouTube challenges, and Ballinger discussing culture and current topics or vlogging her activities with her family, friends and YouTube colleagues. The channel is "highly recommended" by Emertainment Monthly. It has received more than 1.9 billion views and accumulated more than 8 million subscribers. Her Miranda Sings channel has surpassed 2.3 billion views and 10 million subscribers. A third channel, Colleen Vlogs, with more than 3 million subscribers and 0.9 billion views, chronicles some of her experiences at home and on tour. In 2014, Backstage magazine identified Ballinger as a performer who has "taken great advantage of producing their own content [online] and gathering large fan bases to promote their work". To promote her videos and shows, Ballinger is active on social media, with TikTok followings of more than 13 million for Miranda and 8 million for Ballinger, Instagram followings of more than 6 million for Miranda and 7 million for Ballinger, more than 2 million Twitter followers for Miranda and 1.5 million for Ballinger, and more than 1.5 million page likes on the Miranda Sings Facebook page. BuzzFeed called Miranda "The Queen of Twitter."

Ballinger was able to turn the popularity of her videos into income from a percentage of YouTube advertising fees or occasionally fixed sponsorship fees. Until March 2013, Ballinger's YouTube audience was modest, but in that month, her Miranda Sings channel's audience reached 150,000 subscribers, and both of her YouTube channels began to expand far more rapidly. Ballinger offers merchandise on her mirandasings.com website, and some of the videos contain brand endorsements. For example, a 2016 video, "Sexy Buttery Love Song", promoted Jack in the Box restaurants. In 2016, Forbes magazine ranked Ballinger as the ninth-highest-earning YouTuber.

Since 2021, Ballinger and her husband, Erik Stocklin, have streamed weekly podcasts titled Relax! with Colleen and Erik on Apple Podcasts and posted them to a YouTube channel with the same name. They posted the 200th podcast in 2025.

=== Accusations of inappropriate conduct ===
In April 2020, 17-year-old fan and YouTuber Adam McIntyre accused Ballinger of "[enlisting] his unpaid help" for content he had suggested for her Miranda Sings social media accounts and of sending him lingerie when he was 13 years old. Ballinger responded that McIntyre had asked for the lingerie after it was offered in one of her livestreams as one of several joke gifts for fans; she said it had been poor judgment to send the underwear to him. She noted that she often uses comedy ideas suggested by fans but admitted that it had been a mistake to allow the young fan to post directly to her Twitter account for a day without carefully vetting the content that he posted. Ballinger also addressed criticism of some of her older videos satirizing Latina and overweight women, agreeing that they were insensitive and apologizing for having posted them. Afterwards, McIntyre continued to post videos criticizing Ballinger.

In June 2023, YouTuber Kodee Dahl, another former fan, posted "purported screenshots" of a group chat of Ballinger participating with minors, including McIntyre, then about 15, where he asked for suggestions for a Q&A on his YouTube channel. Ballinger suggests "Are you a virgin?" and asks McIntyre his favorite sex position. Dahl's video led to renewed accusations by McIntyre and allegations by other former fans and employees, including of racial insensitivity on the set of Haters Back Off. Ballinger posted a video in response while singing and playing the ukulele in which she admitted that she had made mistakes but denied being a groomer and called the accusations "lies" and "gossip ... made up for clout". The video received negative comments and was widely parodied online.

In July, an ex-employee alleged that Ballinger sent him nude photos of YouTube and OnlyFans creator Trisha Paytas. McIntyre then asserted that Ballinger sent him the same images when he was a minor. Paytas soon released a video condemning Ballinger and ending their association. Ballinger cancelled the remainder of her 2023 live shows. Writing for Vanity Fair, Andrew Quintana suggested that "the substance of Ballinger's alleged grooming ... has not been interrogated by media outlets reporting on the controversy" and expressed his belief that her alleged behavior "does not approach the sexual exploitation or abuse that ... 'grooming' indicates", while critiquing the frequency with which "justifiable outrage turns to silly memes and headlines and videos." In September, on his podcast, Howie Mandel asked JoJo Siwa about her friendship with Ballinger and whether she thought the accusations against Ballinger are "all a lie". Siwa said, "The internet was able to capitalize off of her cancellation ... a lot of it is based off of lies." In November, Ballinger resumed vlogging on YouTube.

== Miranda Sings ==
=== YouTube videos ===
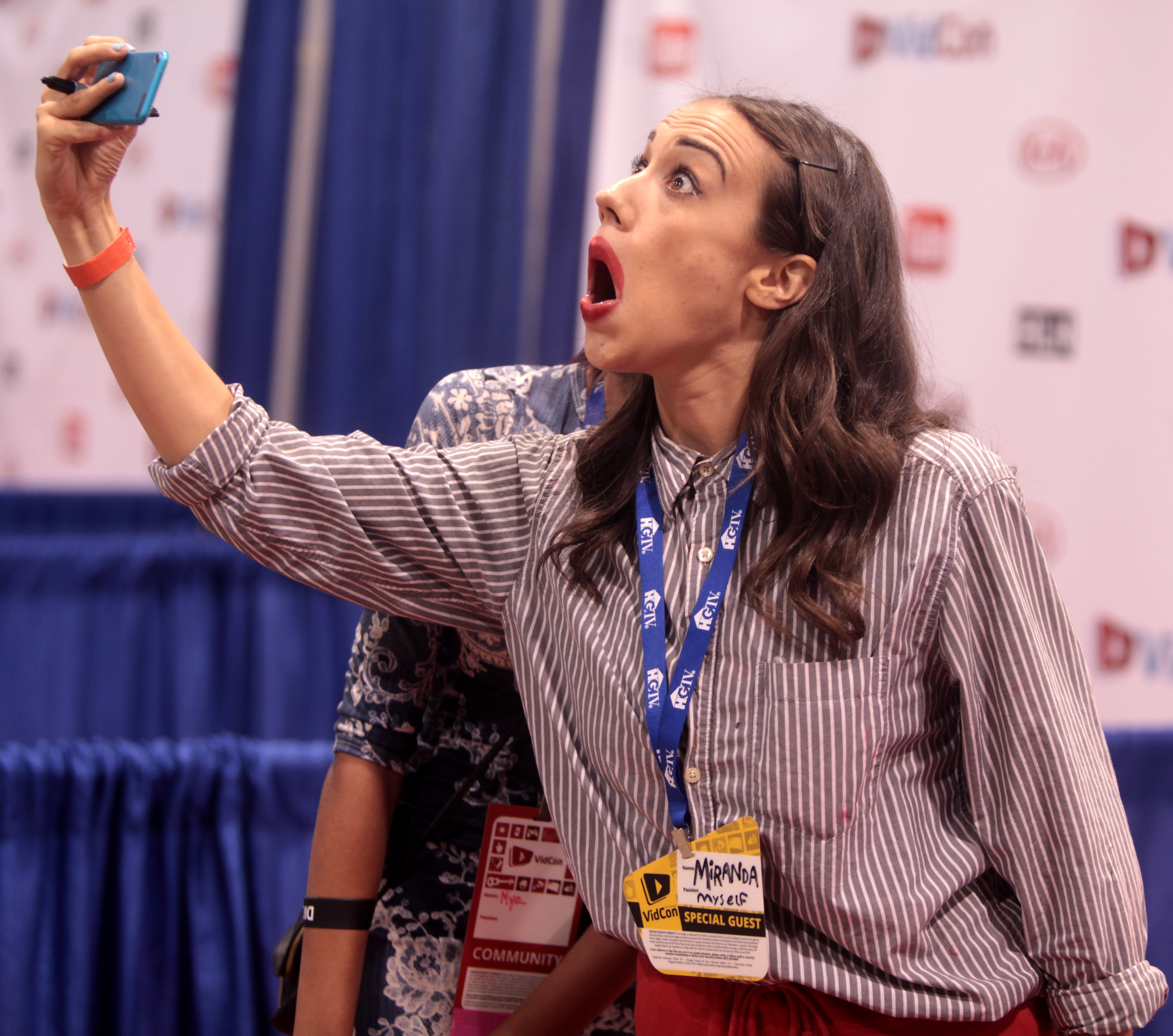
"Miranda Sings" at VidCon 2014 in Anaheim, California

Since January 2008, Ballinger has posted hundreds of videos as her comically talentless and quirky character, Miranda Sings, primarily on the YouTube channel Miranda Sings. The character is a satire of the many YouTube videos featuring bad, but egotistical, performers who film themselves singing as a form of self-promotion, despite receiving the realistic or cruel comments of "haters". "Miranda" is supposedly a home-schooled young woman who still lives with her mother and uncle; she is eccentric and infantilized, narcissistically believes that she was born famous and is obsessed with show business fame.

In the videos, Miranda sings in a comically off-key, yet plausible, voice and covers mostly pop music hits; rants about internet haters; gives "tutorials"; and sometimes discusses the character's backstory or current events, which she usually misunderstands. She uses spoonerisms and malapropisms; is irritable, ludicrously self-absorbed and self-righteous, socially awkward; and has a defiant, arrogant attitude. She responds to viewers who take the videos seriously and offer criticism with the catchphrase, "Haters back off!", telling these critics that "haters make me famous". The character displays unusually active eyebrows and a crooked smile, her head is cocked to one side, and she has pronunciation quirks. She wears bright red lipstick drawn beyond the borders of her lips, dresses in mismatched out-of-style clothing, and often dances stiffly to the music she is performing. Her views of society and morality are politically incorrect, and she displays a strong aversion to anything risqué, which she calls "porn". From 2010 to 2012, Ballinger posted Miranda video blogs to a second Miranda YouTube channel, Mirandavlogz.

Ballinger based the character partly on young women that she knew in college. She told The Times of London, "There were a lot of cocky girls who thought they were really talented, and they ... were so rude and snotty. ... Then I saw all these girls trying to make a career out of putting videos on YouTube [of themselves singing in their bedrooms] ... clueless to the fact that they were terrible." At first, the "Miranda videos were meant to be an inside joke" among Ballinger's friends. In March 2009, however, a Miranda video called "Free Voice Lesson" quickly became a sensation. The video consists of bad advice about singing technique. Miranda's videos drew predictably sharp criticism on YouTube, and as they became popular, Ballinger modified the character in response to the negative comments. She says: "I took what people hated and exaggerated it more in the next video." The online critics were so harsh that Miranda became a "hero of the anti-bullying movement". Ballinger uses "humour and satire to challenge ideas of popular femininity. ... Miranda Sings ... puts on monstrous makeup to perform parody music videos [rejecting] being conventionally pretty".

After Ballinger became pregnant in 2018, Miranda began a pregnancy storyline in which she claims to be the "virgin Miranda", with a virgin conception. Ballinger mentioned the story arc on a July 2018 appearance on Live with Kelly and Ryan. When Ballinger gave birth, she tweeted about it from Miranda's account as well as her own.

=== Live comedy act ===
Beginning in April 2009, Ballinger performed a one-woman comedy act, as Miranda Sings, at first in cabaret spaces and later in theatres in New York, London and other cities in the US, UK, Australia, Europe, Canada and elsewhere. BroadwayWorld.com called Miranda "the hottest, freshest and oddest breakout star in the musical theatre/cabaret scene".

In live comedy acts, Miranda sang pop hits and some musical theatre songs in her signature off-key style. At early performances, she gave "voice lessons" or "acting lessons" to Broadway or West End stars, such as Sutton Foster and Andrew Rannells; assembled casts of Broadway shows; and pop stars such as Ariana Grande, in which she was hypercritical of the stars' performances, telling them that they should leave show business. She read or sang hate mail that she has received, interacted with audience volunteers, used projected presentations containing terrible spelling, and included a "magic trick" where she sang while appearing to be stabbed through the neck by a sword; the joke is that she sings better when the sword is inserted through her neck.

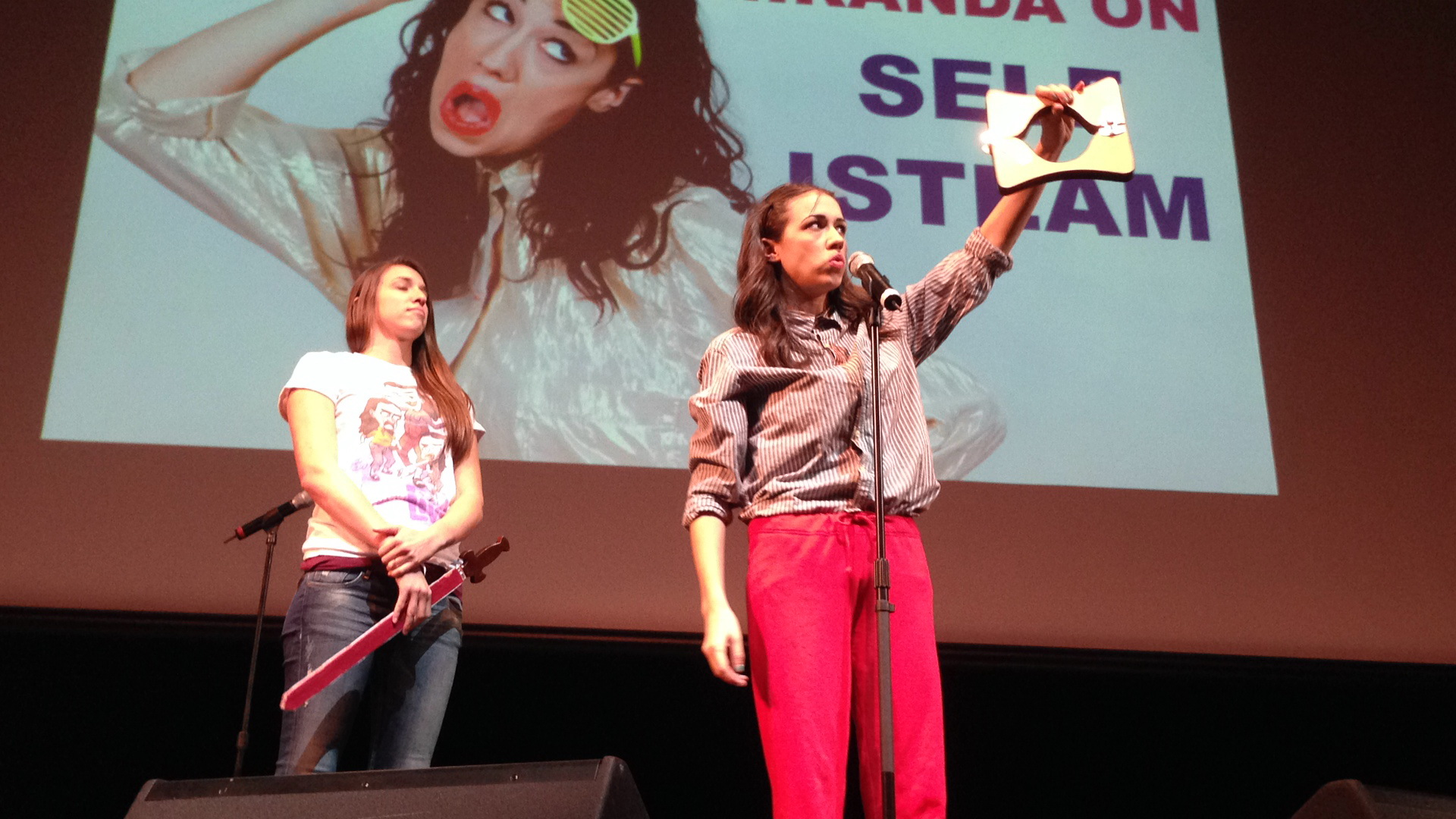
Miranda, with Rachel Ballinger, on stage in 2014

In her 2014 "Selp Helf" tour, she instructed her (mostly young, female) audience on how to get a boyfriend by being more Miranda-like, and could be seen, "improvising [with volunteers] and creating punchlines on the spot. ... Ballinger, the genius behind Miranda, is so convincing in the role, you ... will likely forget that there is a normal person behind the red lips", according to The Badger Herald. One reviewer commented that the show "is no mere ... reproduction of her Internet channel. It is as theatrical as it is musical, comedic as it is inspirational". Another concurred: "Miranda [is] hilarious, and I was struck on several occasions by what an accomplished creation the character is. ... Bridging both personas, the moment she transforms into Miranda, on-stage and mid-song, is an absolute joy – I'd struggle to recall hearing an audience erupt to such an extent, and I couldn't help but join in." Ballinger gave Miranda shows in 57 cities in 2014. Her 2015 tours included a "Miranda 4 Precident" [sic] themed tour and a "Summer Camp" themed tour. Also in 2015, Miranda was a headliner at the Just for Laughs festival in Toronto, Ontario, and released a film version of one of her stage shows on Vimeo, titled Miranda Sings: Selp Helf.

Reviewing Ballinger's second engagement as Miranda at the LaughFest festival in Grand Rapids, Michigan, in 2016, a critic noted that the material "resonated with parents as well as the younger set". Among other appearances, she performed as Miranda at the Kennedy Center in April 2016. During the second half of 2016, she toured Miranda shows in the US, England, Ireland, Germany and Denmark, around her Haters Back Off production and promotion schedule. A tour in early 2017, and later performances that year, were billed as "Miranda Sings Live ... Your [sic] Welcome" and involved Miranda celebrating her own funeral. She continued to tour from September 2017 to early 2018 with shows in Europe, Australasia and the US. Her tour in mid-2018 was called Miranda Sings Live ... No Offense. Of Ballinger's last live show of 2018, reviewers for OC Weekly wrote:

With understanding, charisma and just the right amount of self-deprecation, [Ballinger] skillfully sewed together stories of passive aggressive parents and internet trolls, painting a picture of how difficult it is to be yourself in a world of critics – especially when your art is misunderstood. ... With impressive energy, she mixed kid-friendly and adult humor, seesawed between Italian opera and meme-ish internet bangers, and invited an eclectic mix of audience participation on and off stage. ... Her relevant dedication to self-confidence proved a charming theme throughout the show. Truly ahead of her time, she has built a career on empathizing with young people. ... There's something about this specific kind of celebrity that is difficult to understand. It's fresh.

A Netflix comedy special, Miranda Sings Live... Your Welcome, filmed live at the Kennedy Center's Eisenhower Theater in Washington, D.C., was released on June 4, 2019. Sara Aridi of The New York Times wrote: "Her peculiar sense of humor is the kind that simultaneously draws laughs and cringes – and it works." The same month, Ballinger began touring a Miranda show titled "Who Wants My Kid?", which continued throughout 2019 and into early 2020. BroadwayWorld called her 2022 tour her "funniest one yet". She continued to tour until June 2023.

=== Other Miranda appearances and activities ===
In 2009, Ballinger released a Christmas EP titled Christmas With Miranda Sings. Miranda has been featured in radio, television and internet interviews. Ballinger has also appeared or hosted as Miranda at award shows and given benefit concerts and workshops. Miranda sings two tracks in character on Passey's album Self Taught, Still Learning. In 2012, the character appeared in a comedy film, Varla Jean and the Mushroomheads, and in an episode of the television show Victorious, titled "Tori Goes Platinum", on the Nickelodeon channel. Miranda appeared in the first episode of Dance Chat, an Australian web show, in 2013. She also appeared in a 2014 back-to-school video for Old Navy.

Ballinger guest-starred as Miranda Sings in the season 5 episode, "Happy Thanksgiving Miranda", of Comedians in Cars Getting Coffee with Jerry Seinfeld, in November 2014. Seinfeld called Miranda "a very well-developed character ... just as funny to me as ... to my daughter, who is 13. ... [The episode is] one of the best shows of Comedians in Cars we've ever done". Mediaite agreed, writing: "In its fifth season, Jerry Seinfeld's web series continued to be one of the most enjoyable weekly events on the internet. His experience with YouTube star Miranda Sings, which carried its way onto the Tonight Show, was a particular highlight." An Uproxx review compared Ballinger to Andy Kaufman. In December 2014, Ballinger appeared as Miranda on The Tonight Show playing Pictionary with Jimmy Fallon, Martin Short and Jerry Seinfeld. Us Weekly called the segment "the most hilarious game night ever", Entertainment Weekly called it "riveting", and People magazine wrote: "It's the most wonderful trainwrecked game of Pictionary you'll see this holiday season".

In 2015, Ballinger appeared as Miranda on The Grace Helbig Show, together with Jim Parsons, and she released a book, Selp-Helf, published by Simon & Schuster, which calls it a "decidedly unhelpful, candid, hilarious 'how-to' guide". Written in Miranda's voice by Ballinger and her brother Christopher Ballinger, it is presented in mock-scrapbook format, with silly advice, photos and comically bad artwork. The book debuted at No. 1 on the Publishers Weekly Hardcover Non-Fiction best sellers list and The New York Times Best Seller list for Advice, How-To & Miscellaneous. It remained on the Times' Best Seller list for Advice & Misc. for 11 weeks and was on their monthly Best Seller list for "Humor" for eleven months. She released a second book, My Diarrhe, in 2018, in the form of a leaked diary. It debuted at No. 8 on The New York Times Best Seller list for Advice, How-To & Miscellaneous. Ballinger appeared on The Late Show with Stephen Colbert in July 2018 to promote the book.

Ballinger appeared as a guest star, as Miranda, speed dating unsuspecting men on the 2016 YouTube Premium series Prank Academy. She conceived, co-wrote, co-produced and starred as Miranda in the Netflix series, Haters Back Off. The series centered around Miranda's odd family life and her road to fame as a YouTuber. Ballinger was featured as Miranda in a cover article in Variety about the show in June 2016. The series ran for two seasons in 2016 and 2017. To promote Haters Back Off, Ballinger appeared on The Tonight Show three times, Chelsea, Live with Kelly and Ryan three times, and Total Request Live. The series was not picked up for a third season.

Ballinger, as Miranda, returned to television in 2022 as a guest star on the game show Generation Gap.

== Personal life ==
Ballinger moved to New York City in 2010 to pursue performing opportunities but returned to the West Coast of the United States in 2012 to maximize her YouTube audience by collaborating with more YouTubers, many of whom were based in Los Angeles. In July 2015, after several years of dating, Ballinger and Joshua Evans wed in California. In September 2016, Ballinger and Evans announced in separate YouTube videos that they were divorcing.

Ballinger met actor Erik Stocklin in 2016 when she cast him to play Miranda's love interest, Patrick, in Haters Back Off. The couple began dating by early 2018 and married later the same year. They have three children.

== Reception ==
Ballinger's YouTube videos have received a total of more than 5 billion views. In 2015, Miranda was ranked the 7th "most popular YouTube personality", by Daily American, and one of the "Top 25 Digital Stars", by The Hollywood Reporter. The Los Angeles Times wrote of her videos, "this footage is a major hoot". Perez Hilton praised Miranda's parody of Sia's song "Chandelier" as "the crowning achievement of music video parodies ... utterly fantastic. ... [Ballinger] really has superb comedic timing". Initially, Miranda Sings enjoyed widespread popularity among musical theatre fans. Later, her fan base expanded particularly among teenagers. TV Guide commented: "Ironically, the character ... was created to satirize the very type of YouTube fame she's managed to cultivate."

The Times of London commented that although Ballinger's videos have gained her character notice, it "is not online but on stage that Miranda truly comes to ghastly life". A reviewer from the Irish Independent wrote: "There is an endearing sweetness to her performance. ... This bizarre and bonkers show is somehow strangely compelling". A 2013 reviewer concurred: "[O]nly a truly talented performer could make the Miranda character believable, let alone as endearing as she ends up being." AussieTheatre.com stated that Ballinger "creates the most successful parody of the world of YouTube ... she has created an international cult following". As the popularity of the character increased, Ballinger was able to book her live Miranda act at larger and larger venues, including the Best Buy Theater in New York City and, among many others, London's Cadogan Hall. Newsweek's review of Miranda's YouTube satire of the 2019 James Charles/Tati Westbrook feud noted that although the character "rarely humanizes herself", she has the surprising ability to "make our heart hurt".

Ballinger's videos as herself have also gained attention: in 2015, her video "Reading Mean Comments" was praised by Cosmopolitan as "hilarious and pretty poignant". In each of 2014, 2015, 2016, 2017 and 2018, Ballinger (or Miranda) was nominated for one or more Teen Choice Awards, winning the award for "Web Star: Comedy" in 2015; she was nominated for three 2015 Streamy Awards, winning for best actress, and was nominated for more Streamys in 2016 and 2018; she was nominated for People's Choice Awards in 2016, 2017 and 2019; and Shorty Awards in 2016, 2017 and 2019. Ballinger was ranked No. 5 on Forbes magazine's 2017 list of top entertainment influencers. She has been ranked No. 1 several times in the weekly Top Comedians Social Media Rankings by The Hollywood Reporter.

== Filmography ==
=== Film ===
Year	Title	Role	Notes
2011	Varla Jean and the Mushroomheads	Miranda Sings	
2015	Miranda Sings: Selp Helf	Miranda Sings/writer	Vimeo special/TV movie
2018	Ralph Breaks the Internet	Colleen	Voice (cameo)
2019	The Angry Birds Movie 2	Roxanne	Voice

=== Television and web series ===
Year	Title	Role	Notes
2012	Dr. Fubalous	Nurse Royal	6 episodes (also Miranda Sings in 1 episode)
2012	Victorious	Miranda Sings	Episode: "Tori Goes Platinum"
2013	The Flipside	Girl under bed	"Under the Bed"
2013	Hipsterhood	Amara	Hipster Mecca: The Silverlake Farmer's Market
2013	Homemade Movies	Meg Griffin	"Family Guy Live Action Intro"
2014	MyMusic	Receptionist	"Wedding Plans!"
2014	Comedians in Cars Getting Coffee	Miranda Sings	Episode: "Happy Thanksgiving, Miranda"
2014	The Tonight Show Starring Jimmy Fallon	Miranda Sings	Episode: – "Martin Short/Gabrielle Union/Mary J. Blige" (Pictionary with Seinfeld, Short and Fallon)
2015	The View	Herself/Guest co-host	Episode 18.83; "Comedian Colleen Ballinger and singer Michelle Williams guest co-host"
2015	The Grace Helbig Show	Herself	Episode: "Whelp!: Jim Parsons & Colleen 'Miranda Sings' Ballinger & John Green"
2015	HeyUSA	Herself	TV mini-series; "Mamrie + Colleen Ballinger: San Francisco Part 1 & Part 2"
2015	How to Makeup	Herself/Miranda Sings	TV mini-series (6 episodes)
2016–2017	Haters Back Off	Miranda Sings/Herself	Main role (16 episodes); co-writer and executive producer
2016	Prank Academy	Miranda Sings	Episode: "Miranda Sings Speed Dating Prank"
2016	The Tonight Show Starring Jimmy Fallon	Herself/Miranda Sings	Episode No. 555 – "Jon Hamm/Colleen Ballinger/Kings of Leon"
2016	Chelsea	Herself	Episode No. 75 – "Please Take My Knickers Off"
2017	Live with Kelly and Ryan	Herself	3 episodes
2017	The Tonight Show Starring Jimmy Fallon	Herself	
2018	The Late Show with Stephen Colbert	Herself	
2018	Escape the Night Season 3	Herself as "The Disco Dancer"	YouTube Premium (6 episodes)
2019	Miranda Sings Live... Your Welcome	Herself/Miranda Sings	Netflix Comedy Special
2019	Escape the Night Season 4	Herself as "The Duchess"	YouTube Premium (9 episodes)
2021	Centaurworld	Crandy	Season 2
2021	Beanie Mania	Herself	HBO Max documentary
2022	Generation Gap	Herself	

== Awards and nominations ==
Year	Award	Category	Result
2014	Teen Choice Awards	Choice Web Star: Comedy	Nominated
2015	Teen Choice Awards	Choice Web Star: Comedy	Won
2015	Streamy Awards	Performance Awards: Best Actress	Won
2015	Streamy Awards	Entertainer of the Year	Nominated
2015	Streamy Awards	Channels, Series or Shows: Comedy	Nominated
2016	People's Choice Awards	Favorite YouTube Star	Nominated
2016	8th Shorty Awards	YouTube Comedian	Nominated
2016	Teen Choice Awards	Choice Web Star: Female	Nominated
2016	Teen Choice Awards	Choice Web Star: Comedy	Nominated
2016	Streamy Awards	Show of the Year: Miranda Sings	Nominated
2016	Streamy Awards	Comedy: Miranda Sings	Nominated
2017	People's Choice Awards	Favorite YouTube Star	Nominated
2017	9th Shorty Awards	YouTuber of the Year	Nominated
2017	Teen Choice Awards	Choice Comedy Web Star	Nominated
2018	Kids' Choice Awards	Favorite Funny YouTube Creator: Miranda Sings	Nominated
2018	Teen Choice Awards	Choice Comedy Web Star	Nominated
2018	Streamy Awards	Collaboration: Miranda Sings and Sofie Dossi	Nominated
2019	11th Shorty Awards	YouTuber of the Year	Nominated
2019	People's Choice Awards	Comedy Act of 2019	Nominated
2022	Kids' Choice Awards	Favorite Female Creator	Nominated
2023	Kids' Choice Awards	Favorite Female Creator	Nominated
