= Selp-Helf =

2015 book by Colleen and Christopher Ballinger

- Author: Colleen Ballinger and Christopher Ballinger
- Genre: Humor
- Published: July 21, 2015
- Publisher: Gallery Books
- Publication place: United States
- Pages: 240
- ISBN: 9781501117947

Selp-Helf is a book by Colleen Ballinger and her brother Christopher Ballinger, released July 21, 2015 by Gallery Books, an imprint of Simon & Schuster. It is a parody of the self-help book genre. Simon & Schuster calls it a "decidedly unhelpful, candid, hilarious 'how-to' guide". The book is written in the voice of Colleen Ballinger's YouTube character Miranda Sings and presented in mock-scrapbook format, with silly advice, photos and comically bad artwork.

The book debuted at No. 1 on the Publishers Weekly Hardcover Non-Fiction best sellers list and The New York Times Best Seller list for Advice, How-To & Miscellaneous, and at No. 6 on USA Today's Best-Selling Books list. It remained on the Times' Best Seller list for Advice & Misc. for 11 weeks and was on their monthly Best Seller list for "Humor" for eleven months.

Andrea Beach of Common Sense Media gave the book a rating of three out of five stars, stating, in part, "Fans of her Miranda Sings YouTube channel will love this colorfully absurd satire of the self-help industry. ...Older teens can be encouraged to think about how Colleen Ballinger ... uses satire, irony, and exaggeration and how those techniques affect the real message conveyed." The site goes on to state, "The book may seem ridiculous at first glance, but mature, media-savvy teens can absorb positive messages about the absurdity of how self-help and self-esteem videos make things look so easy ... and find a sense of community in realizing they're not the only ones who recognize social media's often-unrealistic expectations."
