= Rose Center Theater =

Coordinates: 33.7567°N 117.985°W

The Rose Center Theater is a performing arts theater within the Westminster Rose Center located in Westminster, California. It is part of the larger Rose Center complex that includes multiple ballrooms and banquet facilities. It is the home of the Vietnamese American Philharmonic Orchestra, TNT Productions, and the Westminster Chorale. It has also served as the host to many touring Broadway productions, dance companies, opera troupes, and was the temporary home of the Academy for the Performing Arts during the renovations of Huntington Beach High School.

== History ==
Groundbreaking for the center occurred in April, 2001 with the official grand opening on July 21, 2006.

Originally named 'Westminster Community Cultural Center' on all city filed paperwork prior and during construction.

== Operation ==
The Rose Center Theater is operated by The Rose Center Foundation, a non-profit community volunteer group organized in 1999.

Technical services for theatrical productions and banquet events is provided by The Backstage Supply Co. with offices on-site.

== Theater ==
The state of the art theater seats 419 plus disabled seating and provides a universal venue for every type of entertainment. By use of the curtains, the stage can be altered for solo performances, town hall meetings, large scale musical comedy productions, choral, orchestra, ballet and on stage weddings. The design features excellent acoustics and sight lines. Boxes on both sides of the stage on both upper and lower levels are utilized for musicians or for VIP seating. The backstage areas are fully equipped with lockers, showers, makeup and dressing areas.

Theatrical entertainment equipment includes modern lighting, audio, and video systems. The theater is a Proscenium style stage with traveling curtains and no vertical fly system. Over stage and above audience lighting and rigging positions are accessed through a stretch wire grid system. The lighting system encompasses 192 dimming circuits, networked wired and wireless DMX512-A data connections, ETC and Altman lighting instruments, Strand dimming and control systems. The audio system includes JBL and EAW speakers arranged in a left-right-center orientation, Allen and Heath mixing console, Shure wireless microphones, and a Peavey Media Matrix DSP. Video systems currently consist of LCD projection screen located upstage of the main curtain with VHS, DVD, VGA, Betacam SP, High-8, Mini-DV and universal BNC inputs.

Two box office windows with electronic ticketing system allow guests to pick up or pay for tickets in person or over the phone.

Backstage areas include first-floor box office, office manager, technical office, tool and maintenance areas, men and women's dressing rooms, makeup room, green room, actors' entrance, and loading area capable of unloading any sized cargo truck or flatbed.

Second-floor areas include auxiliary cast member rooms, dimming room, teledata room, audio control booth, lighting control booth, and a stage manager booth.

Third floor, also known as the 'grid level,' areas include large sets storage, props and costume storage, lighting storage, lighting position access, curtain maintenance areas, and follow spot booth.

== Building facts ==
- $19 million construction cost
- 3.8-acre (15,000 m^{2}) land parcel
- 16,000 gross square feet (1,500 m^{2})
- 419-seat theater
- 20 ADA accessible seats
- 42-foot-wide (13 m) proscenium
- 35-foot-deep (11 m) stage
- 22-foot-tall (6.7 m) grid

== Theater Management ==
Current members of the Theater staff include:

- Managing Artistic Director, Tim Nelson
- Box Office Manager, Sherre Titus
- Technical Director, Chris Caputo
- Marketing & Events Manager, Ryan Salazar

== Former staff ==
- Technical Director, Cameron Rawls 2008-2011
- Technical Director, David Kile 2006-2008
- Senior Technician, David May 2006-2008
- Senior Stage Manager, Katharine Kimura 2006-2008

== See also ==
- List of concert halls
- Westminster Rose Center
