= Erik Stocklin =

American actor (born 1982)

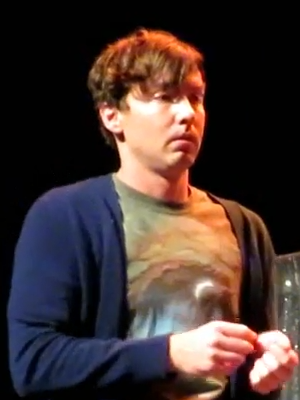
- Stocklin as Patrick in Haters Back Off, 2018.
- Born: September 24, 1982 (age 43); Freehold, New Jersey, U.S.
- Occupation: Actor
- Spouse: Colleen Ballinger (m. 2018)
- Children: 3

Erik Flynn Stocklin (born September 24, 1982) is an American actor. He is known for his recurring roles on television series such as Mistresses, Stalker and Good Trouble, and for his leading role in the Netflix original series Haters Back Off.

== Early life and career ==
Erik Flynn Stocklin was born in Freehold, New Jersey. He attended Southern Connecticut State University and earned a bachelor's degree in theatre in 2007. While in college, he played for four summers with the Elm Shakespeare Company in New Haven, Connecticut. He also trained at the Circle in the Square Theatre School in New York City. In 2008, he moved to California.

Stocklin has played leading roles in feature films including Donner Pass (2011) and The Bad Guys (2015). He also appeared on television in recurring roles on Mistresses (2013) and Stalker (2014–2015), and he guest-starred on The Vampire Diaries (2011), Bones (2014) and Timeless (2018), among others. He has also appeared in national commercials for Marmot, Apple, Hyundai, Mazda and McDonald's.

In 2016 and 2017, he co-starred in the Netflix series Haters Back Off as Patrick Mooney, Miranda's love interest, opposite series creator Colleen Ballinger, whom he married in 2018. Stocklin appeared in two 2019 episodes of the Netflix series Lucifer. In 2021, Stocklin and Ballinger, began a weekly podcast titled Relax! with Colleen and Erik. In 2021 and 2022, he played Matt in the television series Good Trouble.

== Personal life ==
Stocklin began dating Colleen Ballinger, his co-star from Haters Back Off, by early 2018. The couple wed later the same year. They have three children.

== Filmography ==
Year	Title	Role	Notes
2010	First Day	Gregg	8 episodes
2010	Krog	Loudmouth	Pilot
2011	The Vampire Diaries	Stevie	1 episode
2011	Donner Pass	Thomas	Movie
2011	Sick Day	Adrian	Short
2012	Nesting	Ben	Movie
2012	Let's Big Happy	Ryan	3 episodes (composer credit for 1 episode)
2013	Grey Sheep	Paul	Movie
2013	Mistresses	Sam Grey	13 episodes
2014	Bones	Noah Gummersall	1 episode
2014–2015	Stalker	Perry Whitley	13 episodes
2015	The Bad Guys	Noah	Movie
2015	Major Crimes	Brad Powell	1 episode
2016	Criminal Minds	Brian Philips	1 episode
2016–2017	Haters Back Off	Patrick Mooney	Main role, 16 episodes
2017	Girlboss	Dr. Josh	1 episode
2018	Timeless	John Hinckley Jr.	1 episode
2018	High Voltage	Zach	Movie
2019	Lucifer	Julian McCaffrey	2 episodes
2019	Miranda Sings Live... Your Welcome	Patrick Mooney	Netflix Special
2020	Man Camp	Kevin	Video on Demand Movie
2021	Good Trouble	Matt	13 episodes
TBA	Alive (II)	Scott Kane	TV movie
