= Daily American (Pennsylvania) =

Newspaper in Somerset, Pennsylvania, US

- Type: Daily newspaper
- Owner: USA Today Co.
- Founder: Henry Baker Reiley
- Founded: July 1, 1929; 97 years ago
- Language: English
- City: Somerset, Pennsylvania
- Country: United States
- Website: dailyamerican.com

The Daily American is a local, daily newspaper providing coverage of county-wide news and sports in Somerset County, Pennsylvania.

== History ==
The first daily newspaper in Somerset, the Somerset Daily Herald made its first appearance on July 1, 1929, with the headline, "'Polish John pleads today." Initially distributed to 300 subscribers, the publication began under the leadership of Henry Baker Reiley, following his acquisition of the semiweekly Somerset Herald, and was eventually renamed as the Daily American. The family business - Somerset Newspapers Inc., which included the Daily American and the Somerset County Shopper (now known as Somerset County Direct) - was sold by Reiley's grandson in 1997 to Schurz Communications Inc. of South Bend, Indiana.

In 2006, the newspaper opened an office in Johnstown for the start of the Our Town weekly newspaper. It is an information company providing newspapers, websites, books, maps, brochures and place mats and billboards to residents and businesses in Somerset and Cambria counties. According to Charles Welsh, a former Herald employee who later worked as a news editor at the Associated Press World News Service, few in Somerset thought the idea of a daily newspaper would work.

It did under the direction of Reiley and his staff that included, Robert S. Scull, Mary Black and Mary Hause whom Welsh describes as a small-town challenger to Barbara Walters. The paper and its inner-workings including a Linotype, a keyboard machine with a keyboard that listed lower and capital case letters in no particular order, were housed in a three-level brick building across from Somerset County's Courthouse along Union Street. In 1930, the paper moved to 216 W. Main St. where it stayed until 1966, four years after Rev. Henry Reiley Jr. Henry Baker Reiley's son, became publisher. He relocated the paper's office again and constructed a new building at 334 W. Main St.

The third-generation Reiley, David H. Reiley, began working at the paper in 1970 and was promoted to publisher after his father's death in 1984. Schurz, whose masthead paper is the South-Bend Tribune, named Jon G. Starn as the publisher of the Daily American. Starn retired in 2002 and was replaced by Douglas Caldwell. Starn supervised the Daily American's 10,000 square feet, multimillion-dollar renovation project, which, according to Caldwell, gave the paper local recognition and modern offices. Caldwell was promoted by Schurz on March 6 to oversee the corporation's latest acquisition in Northern Michigan. He is serving as publisher for a daily newspaper and oversees operations at two weekly newspaper and other niche publications including a telephone directory in Petoskey, Michigan.

On May 1, 2006, Andy Bruns, a 41-year-old Hollister, Calif., resident with an extensive background in newspaper advertising, started as the new publisher. The publisher oversees 85 Daily American employees in editorial, circulation and advertising departments. The staff is working in a 2002 two-story building with conference rooms and more space throughout the facility. In June 2011, Bruns also assumed the responsibilities of being publisher for the Herald-Mail newspaper in Hagerstown, Md., another Schurz property. Business Manager Rebecca Flyte was named general manager of the Daily American to assist him in the day-to-day operations. The Thursday, March 7, 2013, newspaper was the last one printed on Somerset's press. On March 8, 2013, all of the newsprint products started being published by the Altoona Mirror. Its news pages deadline was changed from 12:30 a.m. to 11 p.m. to accommodate the new delivery schedule.

On November 19, 2013, a paywall/membership plan was started for digital subscribers. In January 2019, the paper was sold by Schurz Communications to GateHouse Media.

Today, the publication is distributed daily, with a circulation of roughly 13,000.
