= 6th Streamy Awards =

2016 awards ceremony recognizing online video

- Official promotional image for the show
- Date: October 4, 2016
- Location: The Beverly Hilton; Beverly Hills, California
- Presented by: Streamys Blue Ribbon Panel
- Hosted by: King Bach
- Preshow host: Teala Dunn

Highlights
- Most awards: Oscar's Hotel for Fantastical Creatures (3)
- Most nominations: Epic Rap Battles of History; Oscar's Hotel for Fantastical Creatures; MatPat (4)
- Audience Choice: The Philip DeFranco Show (Show of the Year); Yousef Erakat (Entertainer of the Year)

Television/radio coverage
- Network: YouTube
- Runtime: 2 hours
- Viewership: 498,000 live viewers 750,000 total views
- Produced by: Dick Clark Productions; Tubefilter

The 6th Annual Streamy Awards was the sixth installment of the Streamy Awards honoring streaming television series. The awards were broadcast live on YouTube on October 4, 2016 from The Beverly Hilton in Beverly Hills, California. They were hosted by actor and Vine star King Bach, the first black host of the show. In contrast with the 5th Streamy Awards which was televised on VH1 as well as being livestreamed, the Streamy Awards partnered with YouTube as their official livestreaming partner due to a desire to "return to its digital roots" for the 6th Streamy Awards. The official red carpet pre-show hosted by Teala Dunn was also livestreamed on YouTube. To represent changes in the industry within the previous few years, three new award categories were introduced: Virtual Reality and 360° Video, Live, and Feature Film. The show generated a high level of social media interest and was well received by media publications, particularly for a tribute to Christina Grimmie who had died earlier that year.

== Performers ==
In honor of Christina Grimmie, who was shot and killed outside of a concert venue earlier in the year, a medley of her songs was played throughout the show. The tribute was introduced by Shane Dawson and featured speeches by Dawson and Kurt Hugo Schneider. The show also contained musical performances by Biz Markie and Spencer Ludwig, and a musical sketch by Jon Cozart satirizing various social media platforms.

Performers at the 6th Streamy Awards
Artist(s)	Song(s)
Jon Cozart	"Jon Cozart (Paint) Sings a Song About Favorite Platforms"
Spencer Ludwig	"Diggy"
Biz Markie	"Just a Friend"
Sam Tsui; Kurt Hugo Schneider	Medley of covers in memory of Christina Grimmie

== Winners and nominees ==
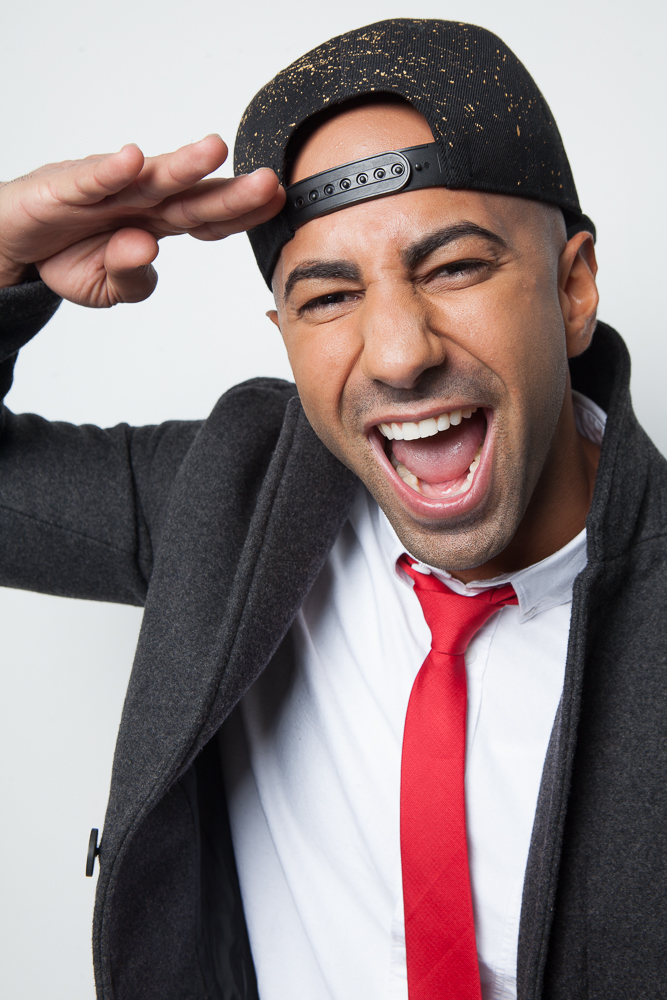
Yousef Erakat, winner of the Audience Choice Award for Entertainer of the Year

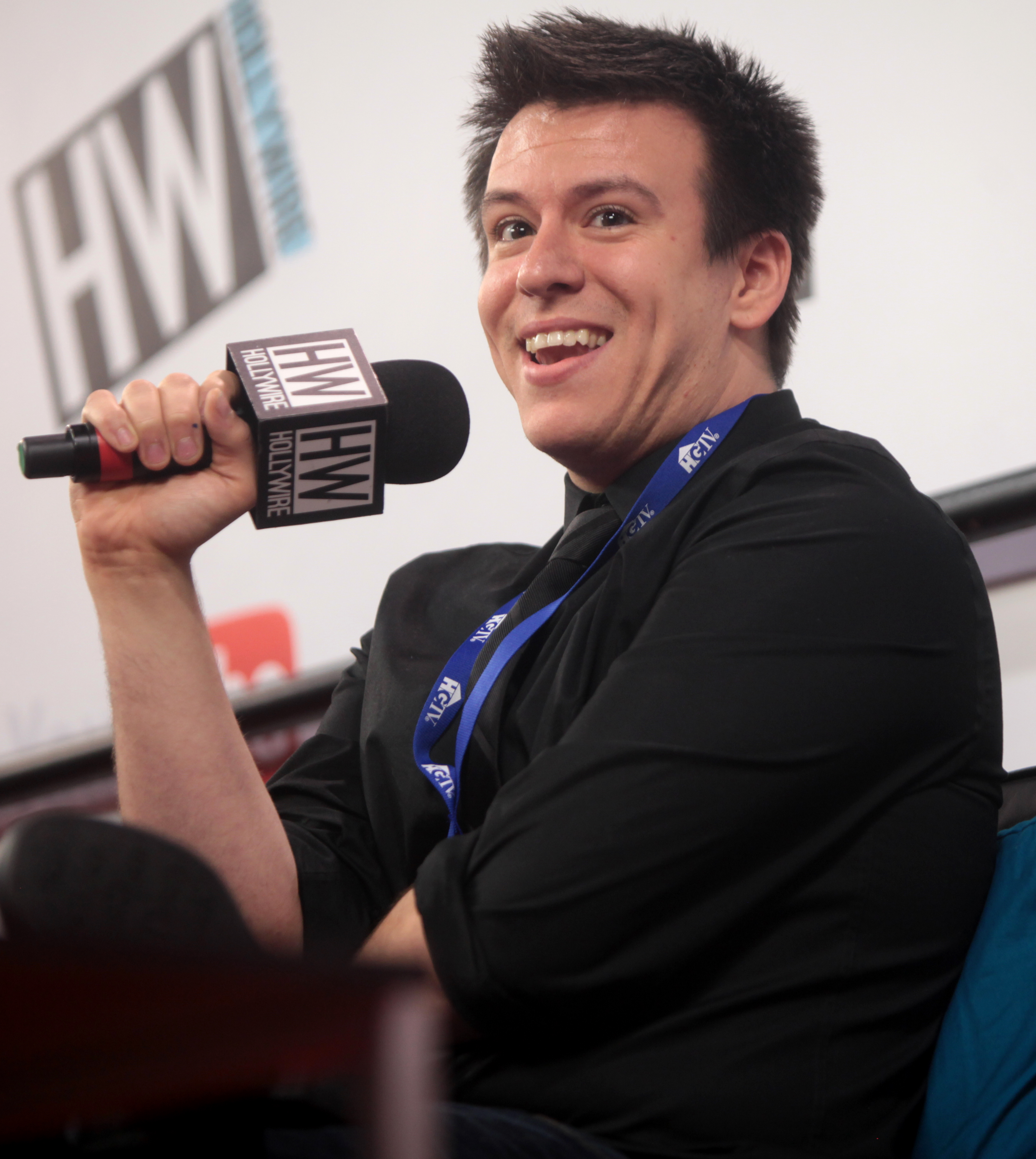
Philip DeFranco, winner of the Audience Choice Award for Show of the Year and the News and Culture category

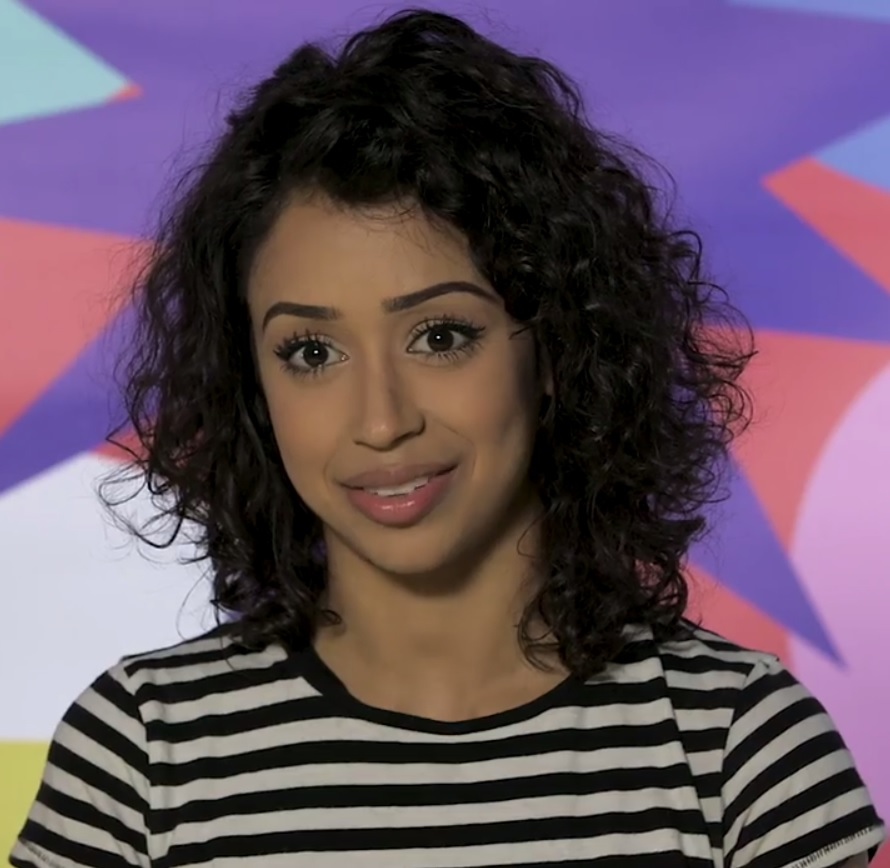
Liza Koshy, winner of the Breakout Creator award

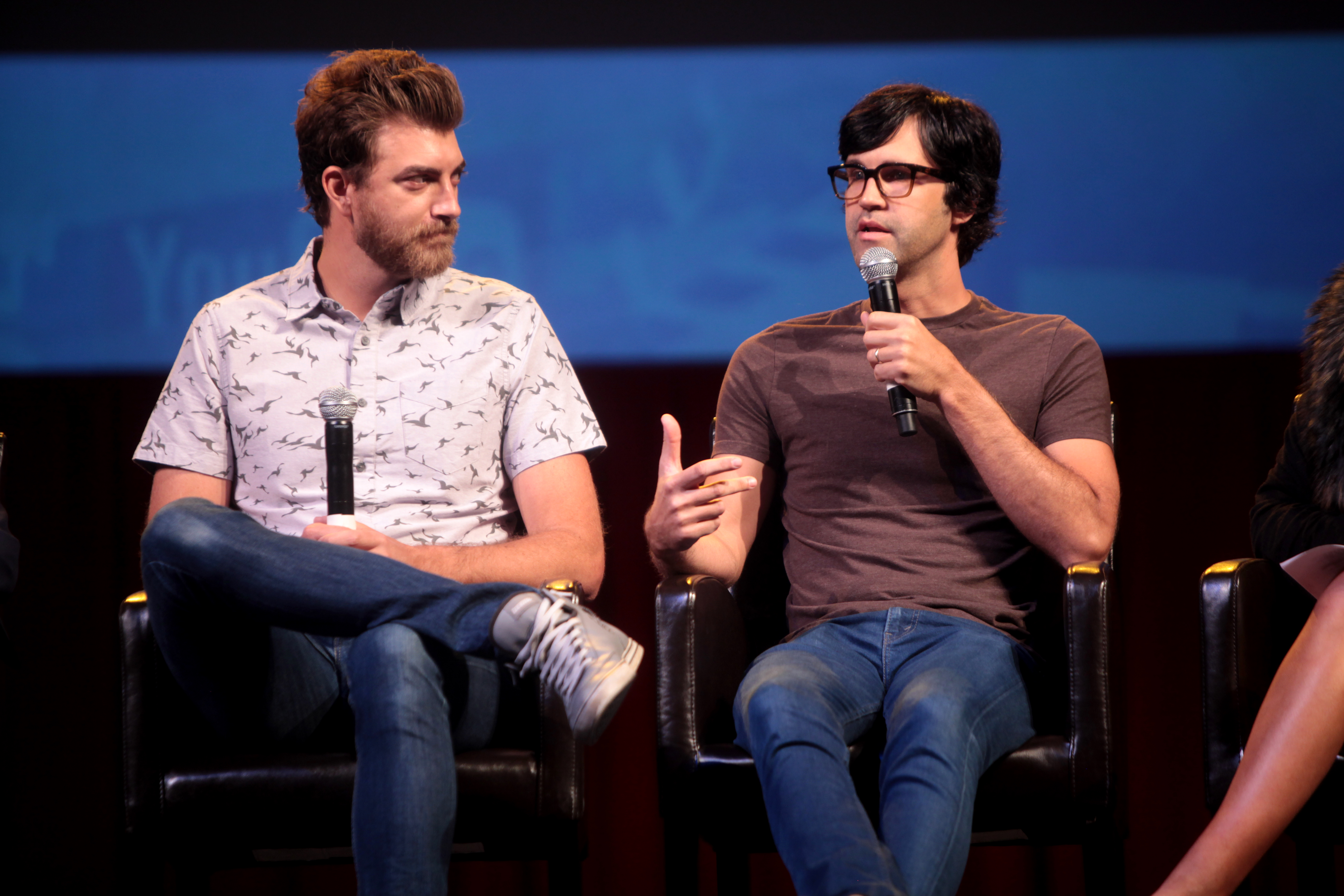
Rhett & Link, winners of the Comedy category

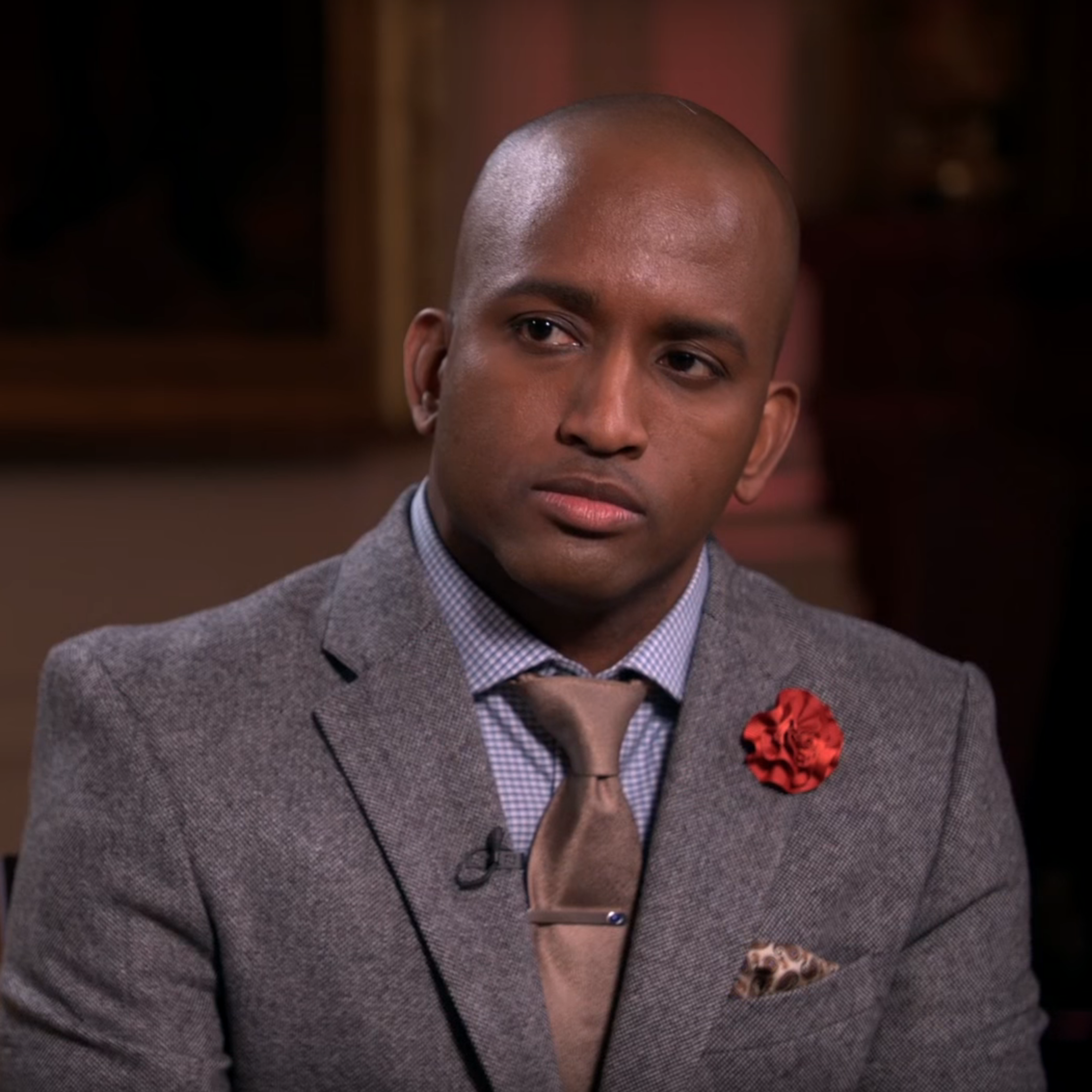
Adande Thorne, winner of the Animated category

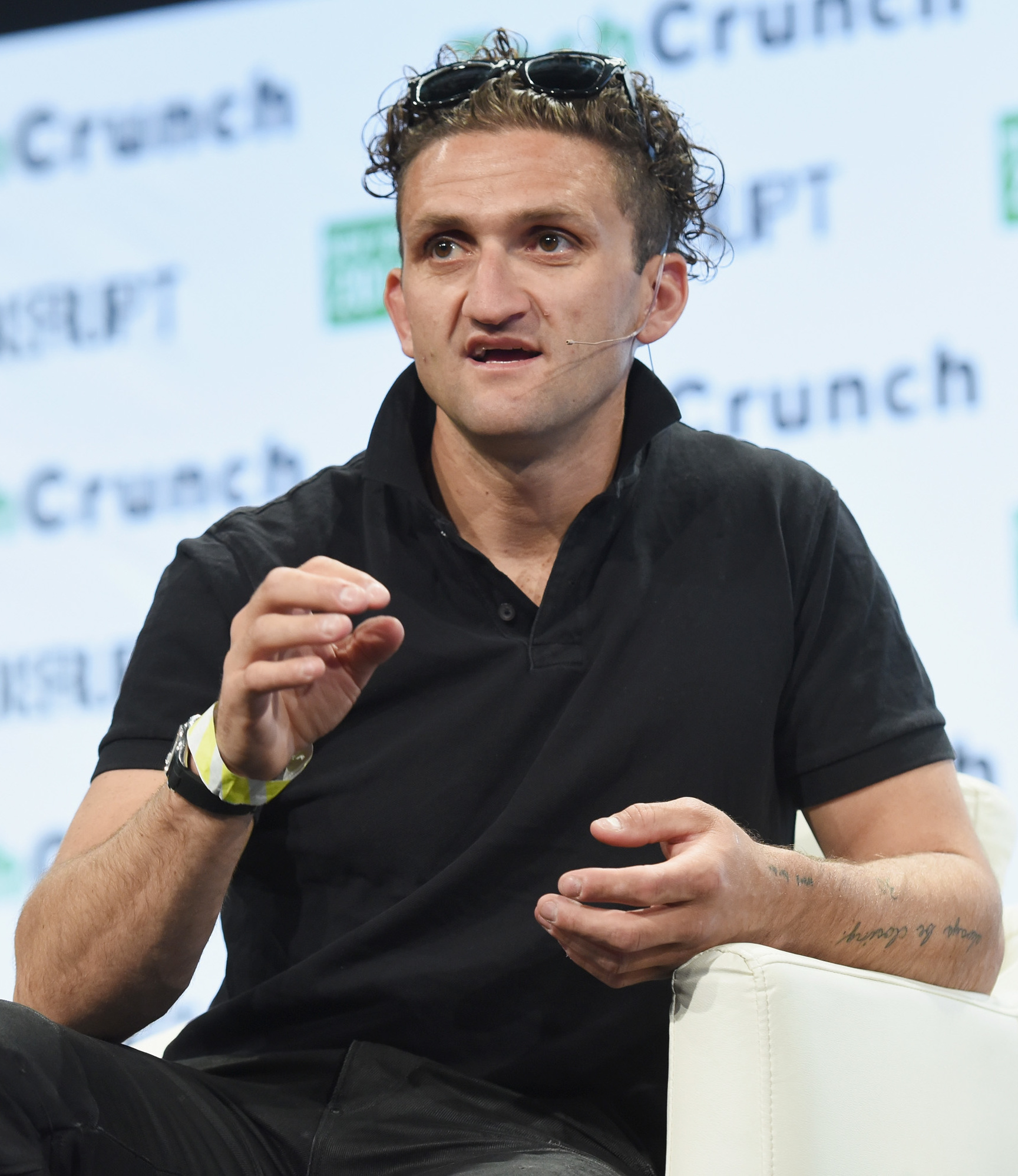
Casey Neistat, winner of the First Person category and Best Editing

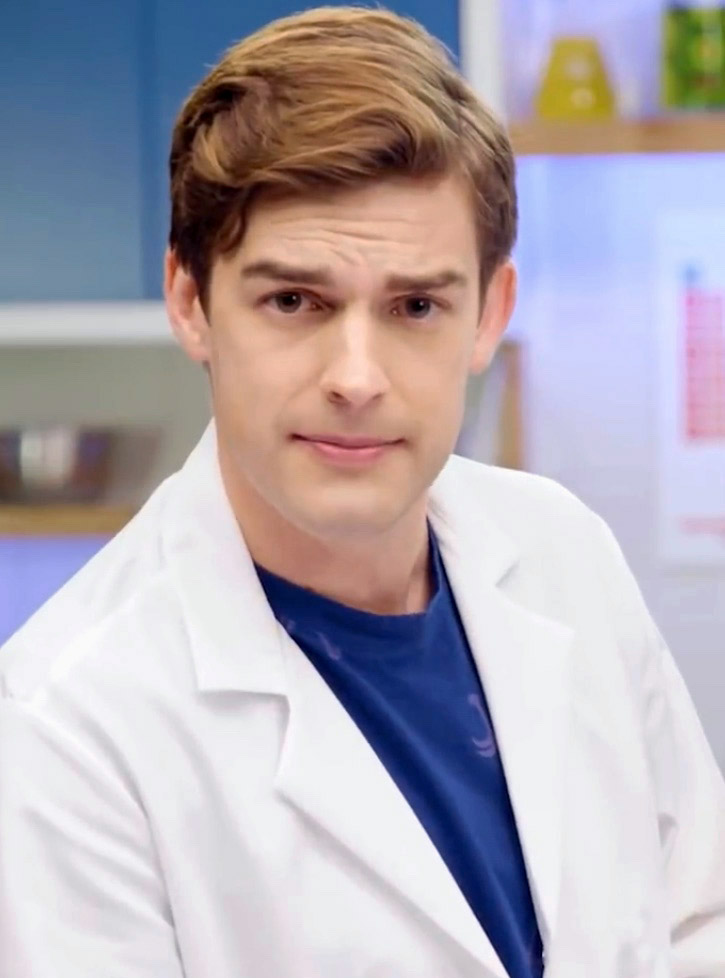
MatPat, winner of the Gaming and Virtual Reality and 360 categories

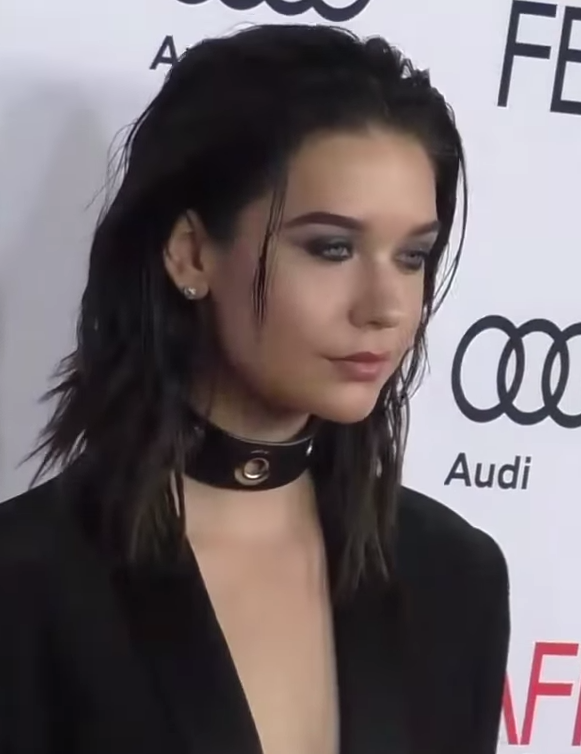
Amanda Steele, winner of the Fashion category

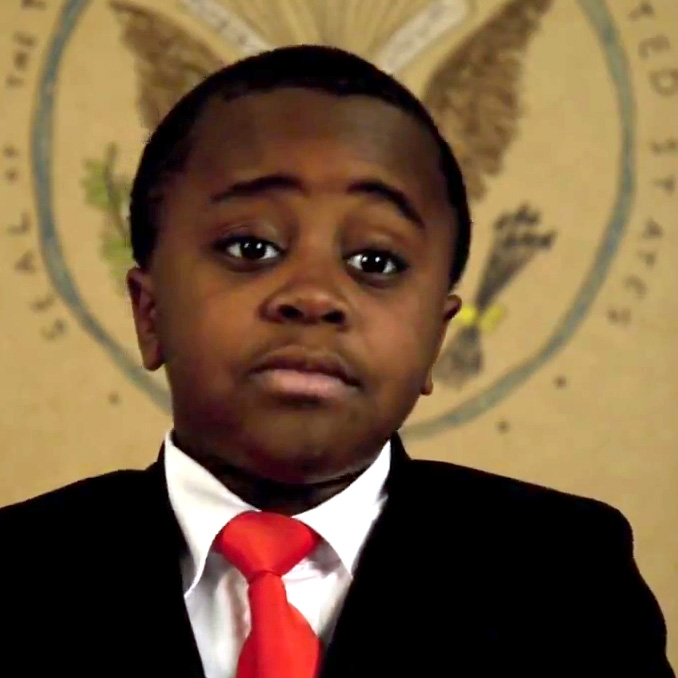
Kid President, winner of the Kids and Family category

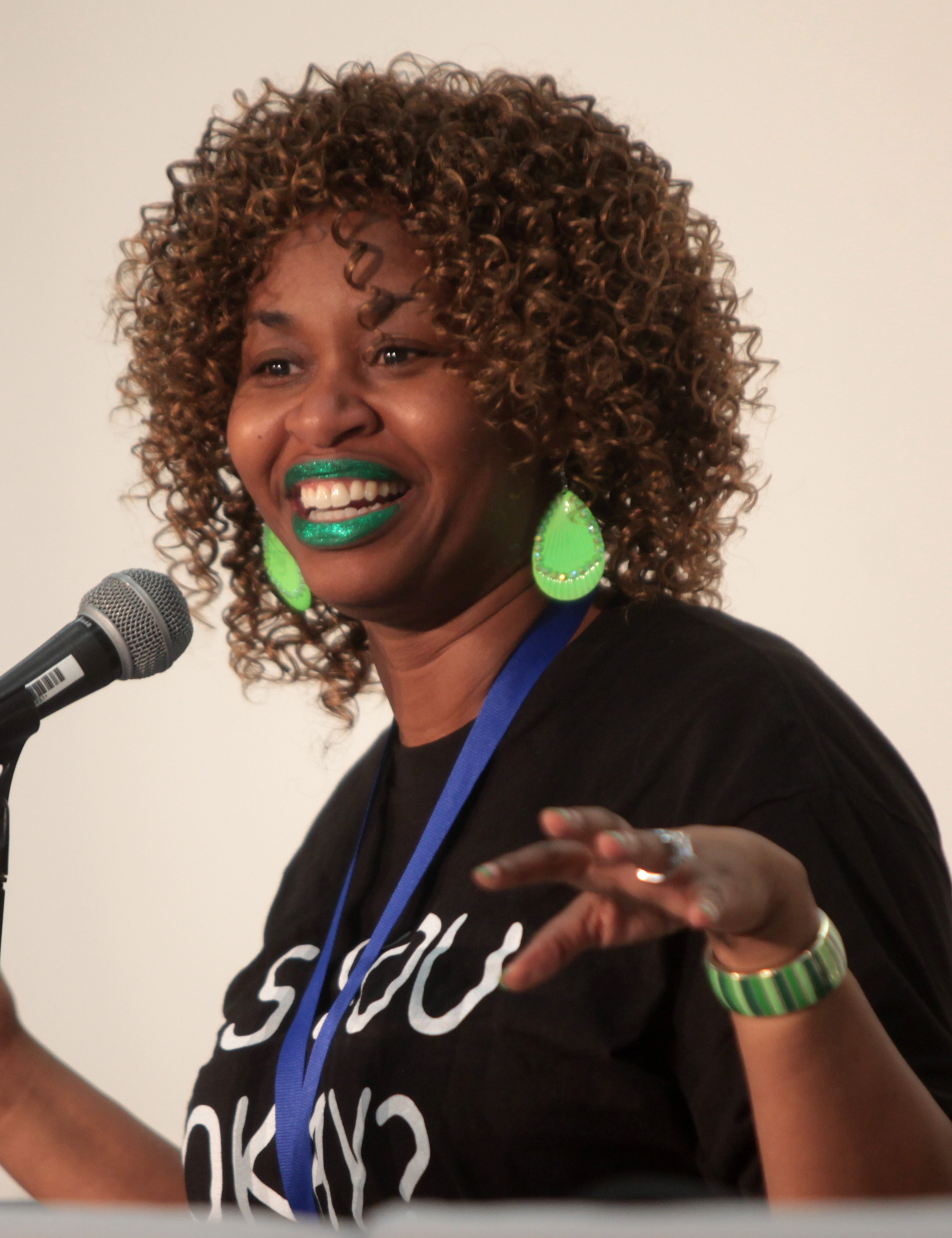
GloZell, winner of the Lifestyle category

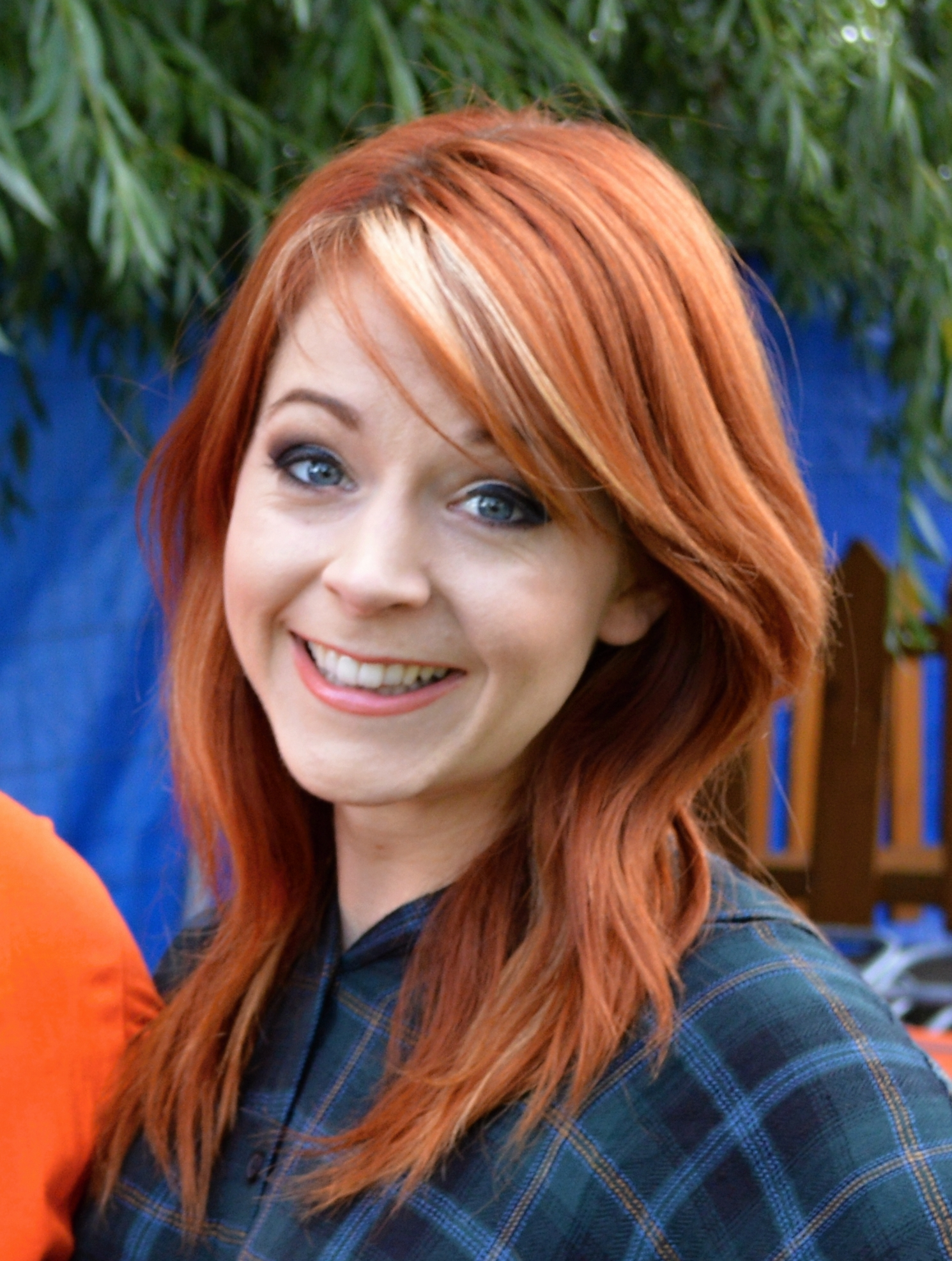
Lindsey Stirling, winner of Best Cover Song

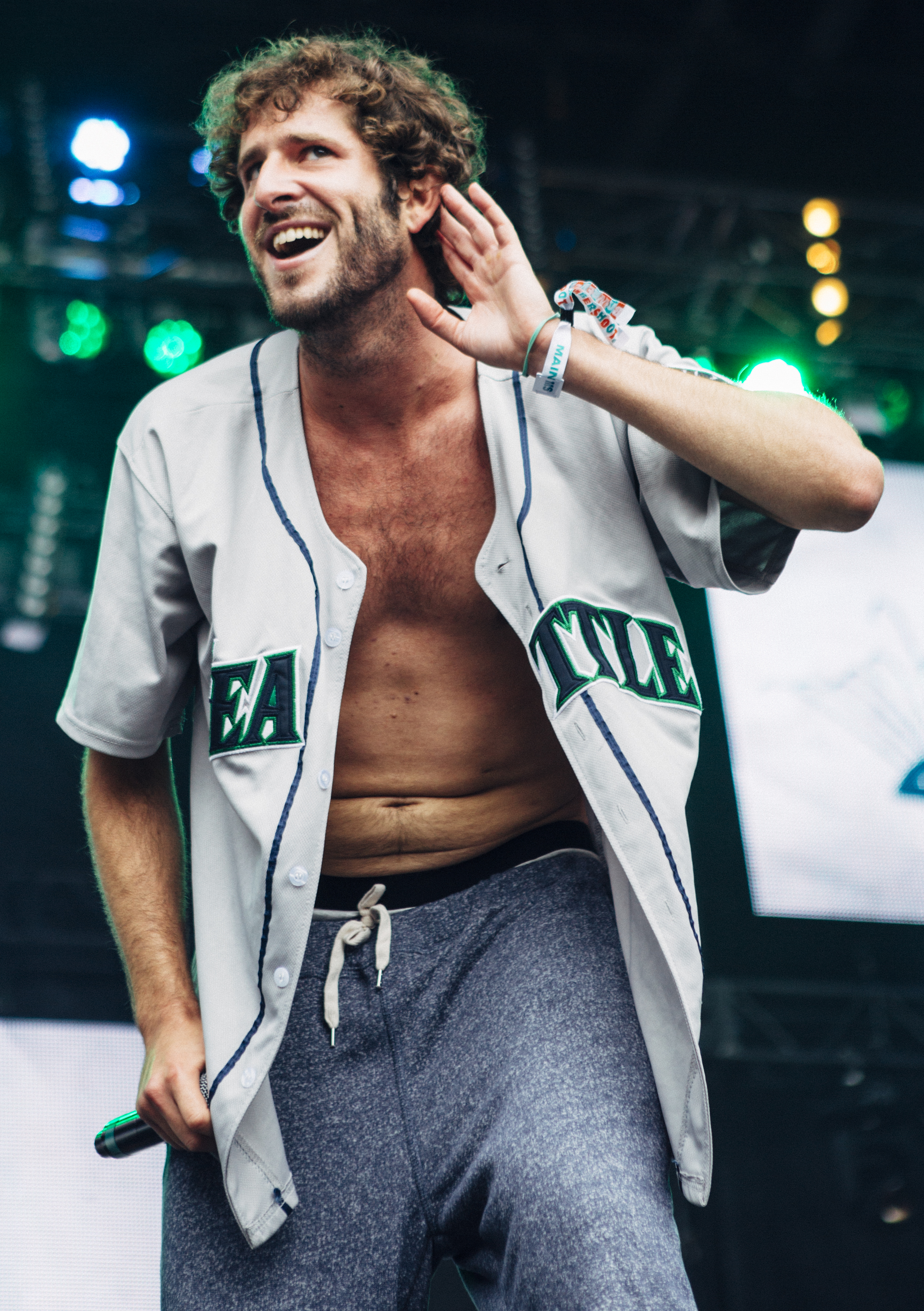
Lil Dicky, winner of Best Original Song

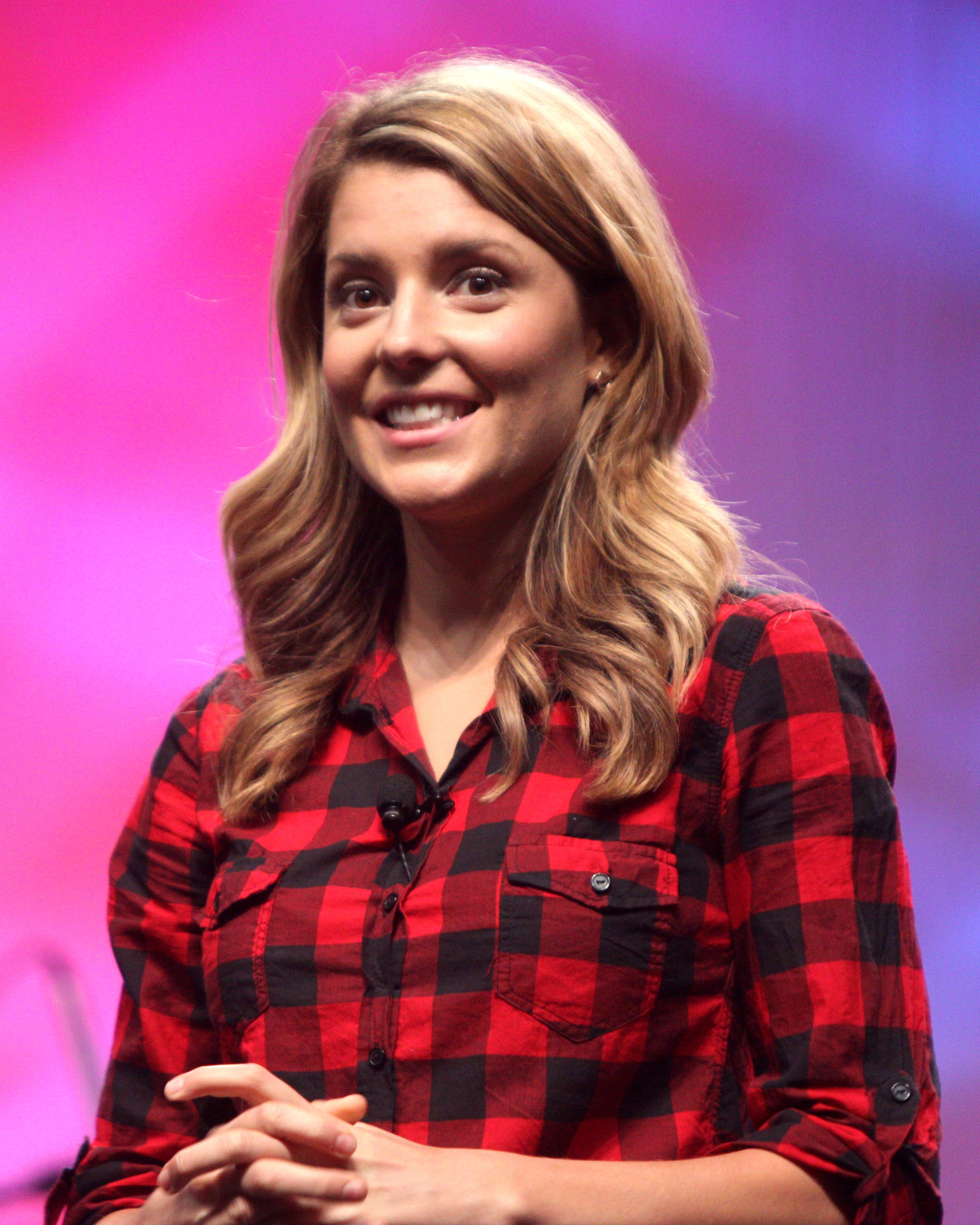
Grace Helbig, winner of the Brand Campaign award

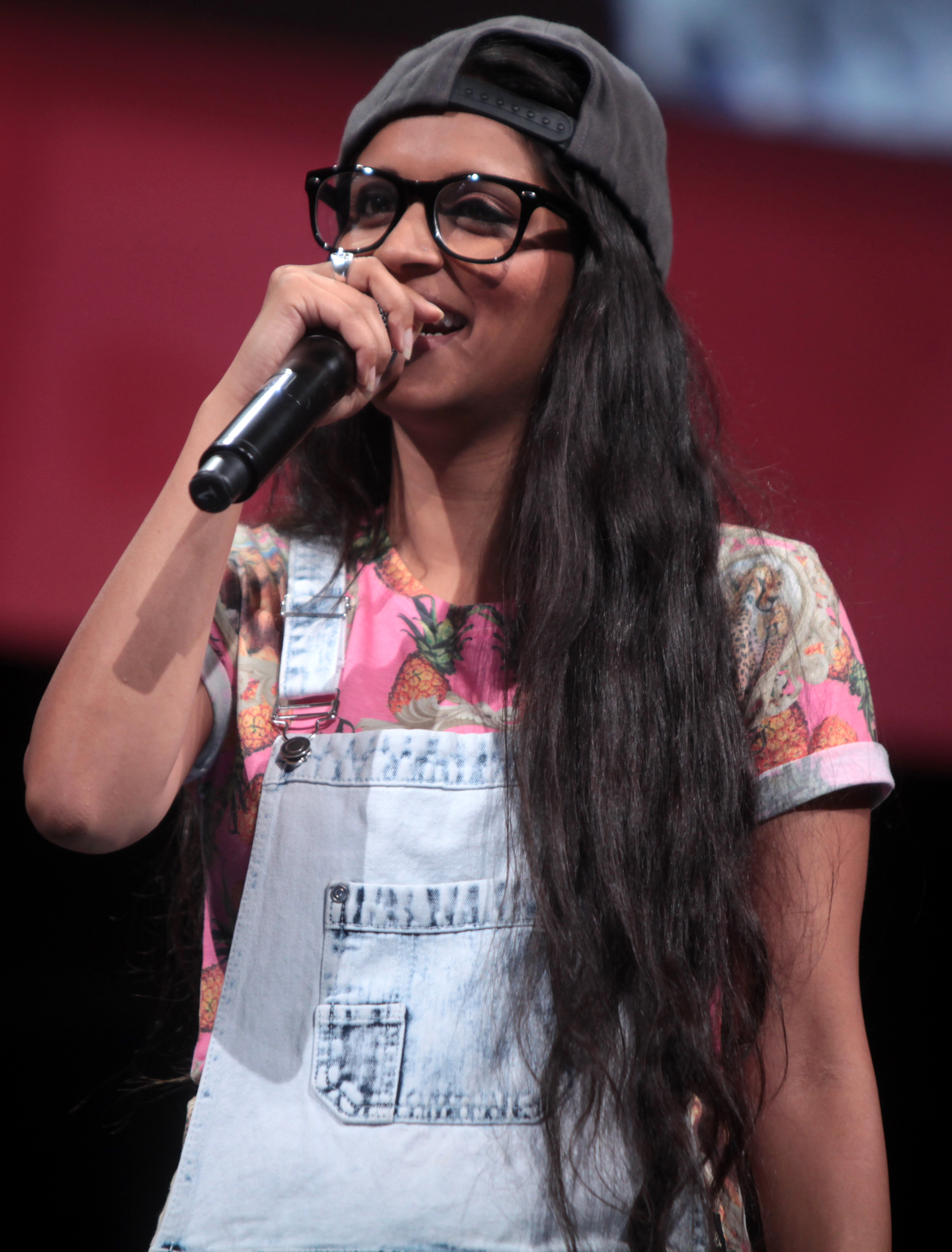
Lilly Singh, winner of the Social Good Campaign award and Best Feature

The nominees were announced by GloZell Green at a ceremony in Santa Monica, California on August 24, 2016. The finalists for the Audience Choice Award categories were announced on September 21, 2016. Winners in 30 of the categories were announced on October 1, 2016 during the Official Streamys Nominee Reception at the YouTube Space LA. The remaining 14 awards were announced during the main ceremony at The Beverly Hilton on October 4, 2016. Winners of the categories were selected by the Streamys Blue Ribbon Panel except for the Audience Choice awards which were put to a public vote.

Winners are listed first, in bold.

OVERALL
Audience Choice Award for Show of the Year	Audience Choice Award for Entertainer of the Year
**The Philip DeFranco Show**; Camp Unplug; Daily Bumps; The Game Theorists; Good Mythical Morning; McJuggerNuggets' Psycho Series; Miranda Sings; Rooster Teeth; The Try Guys; The Young Turks	**Yousef Erakat**; Baby Ariel; Cameron Dallas; Casey Neistat; The Dolan Twins; Kian Lawley; Lilly Singh; Liza Koshy; Roman Atwood; Sky Does Minecraft
International	Breakout Creator
**HolaSoyGerman**; Alice In Paris; BeingIndian; Joe Sugg; Simon and Martina	**Liza Koshy**; Baby Ariel; Dolan Twins; Jacob Sartorius; Simply Nailogical
Comedy	Drama
**Rhett & Link, Good Mythical Morning**; King Bach; Logan Paul; Miranda Sings; Ryan Higa	**I Ship It**; All for One; Making Moves; McJuggerNuggets' Psycho Series; The Skinny
Animated	Feature
**sWooZie**; Cyanide & Happiness; Emo Dad; RWBY; TheOdd1sout; Very Animated People	**A Trip to Unicorn Island**; Bad Night; Buddymoon; Lazer Team; Sickhouse
First Person	Indie
**Casey Neistat**; Andrea Russett; DOSEofFOUSEY; Grace Helbig; Tyler Oakley	**Brooklyn Sound**; Couple-ish; Disposable Teens; Made in Mosjøen; Muzzled the Musical
Non-Fiction	Virtual Reality and 360
**The Try Guys**; @SummerBreak; Do They Know It?; MatPat's Game Lab; Scare PewDiePie	**MatPat's Game Lab**; Discovery VR; Five Nights at Freddy's in Real Life (Devin Super Tramp); National Geographic; Reggie Watts Live in Virtual Reality
SOCIAL VIDEO
Viner	Snapchat Storyteller
**Thomas Sanders**; Brandon Calvillo; chloe lmao; King Bach; Lele Pons	**Shaun McBride (shonduras)**; Cameron Dallas (camerondallas); DJ Khaled (djkhaled305); Julieanna Goddard (yesjulz); Pretty Little Liars (pll)
Live	
**Merrell Twins**; Brandon Rowland; Collins Key; Loren Beech; Roman Atwood	
SUBJECT AWARDS
Action and Sci-Fi	Beauty
**Day 5**; Electra Woman and Dyna Girl; The Fourth Door; Miss 2059; The Parallax Theory	**Kandee Johnson**; Cute Girls Hairstyles; Desi Perkins; Gigi Gorgeous; grav3yardgirl
Documentary or Investigative	Fashion
**The Banker Suicides**; Daughters of Paradise; On Killing; Seeker Stories; Zoomin.TV	**Amanda Steele**; Arden Rose; Aspyn Ovard; Maddi Bragg; Niki and Gabi
Food	Gaming
**Tiny Kitchen**; Feast Of Fiction; How To Cake It; Laura in the Kitchen; Put it in My Mouth	**The Game Theorists**; Critical Role; Markiplier; SkyDoesMinecraft; Smosh Games
Health and Wellness	Kids and Family
**Yoga With Adriene**; Buff Dudes; Furious Pete; Kati Morton; Niomi Smart	**Kid President**; Daily Bumps; DCTC Toy Channel; EvanTubeHD; What's Up Moms
Lifestyle	News and Culture
**GloZell Green**; Connor Franta; Eva Gutowski; Meg DeAngelis; Rachel Levin	**The Philip DeFranco Show**; Clevver; Great Big Story; Tawk; The Young Turks
Pranks	Science and Education
**Roman Atwood**; Coby Persin; fouseyTUBE; Prank Academy; Scamalot	**Laci Green**; Colin Furze; Crash Course; explore.org; Veritasium
Sports	
**30 for 30 Shorts**; Adventures in Golf; Coach Snoop; Dude Perfect; Red Bull	
PERFORMANCE
Actor	Actress
**Chris Kendall, Oscar's Hotel for Fantastical Creatures**; Dean Dobbs, Jack & Dean of All Trades; Jesse Ridgway, McJuggerNuggets' Psycho Series; Kian Lawley, The Chosen; Preston Jones, Sing It!	**Jenn McAllister, Foursome**; Anna Akana, Miss 2059; Grace Helbig, Electra Woman and Dyna Girl; Hannah Hart, Electra Woman and Dyna Girl; Lauren Giraldo, Camp Unplug
Collaboration	Dance
**Various Creators, Jimmy Kimmel Live! (Mean Tweets – Creator Edition)**; Casey Neistat and Jesse Wellens, PrankvsPrank (Aladdin Magic Carpet Prank); Nice Peter, EpicLLOYD, Meghan Tonjes, Mike Betette, and Zach Sherwin, Epic Rap Battles of History (Alexander the Great vs Ivan the Terrible); Roman Atwood and Yousef Erakat, FouseyTube (Caught Naked In Shower Prank!!); Various Creators, Paint (YouTube Culture: A Song)	**Dominic "D-trix" Sandoval**; Artist Request - The New Music Video; BluPrint; Making Moves; Matt Steffanina
Ensemble Cast	
**Escape the Night**; Bad Internet; Camp Unplug; Foursome; Oscar's Hotel for Fantastical Creatures	
MUSIC
Breakthrough Artist
**Todrick Hall**; Hailey Knox; Lil Dicky; Shawn Wasabi; Troye Sivan
Cover Song	Original Song
**Lindsey Stirling, "Hallelujah" (Leonard Cohen)**; Alex Aiono, "One Dance" (Drake) and "Hasta el Amanecer" (Nicky Jam); Boyce Avenue, "Photograph" (Ed Sheeran); Kurt Hugo Schneider, "Send My Love" (Adele); Pentatonix, "No" (Meghan Trainor)	"$ave Dat Money", Lil Dicky, featuring Fetty Wap and Rich Homie Quan; "Boombox", Laura Marano; "Gold", Kiiara; "i hate u, i love u", gnash, featuring Olivia O'Brien; "Way Down We Go", Kaleo
CRAFT AWARDS
Cinematography	Costume Design
**The Slow Mo Guys, Gavin Free and Daniel Gruchy**; Boxed, Pablo Espada; Devin Supertramp, Devin Graham; Lost in Greece, Brandon Li; MysteryGuitarMan, Joe Penna	**Oscar's Hotel for Fantastical Creatures, Gypsy Taylor**; Epic Rap Battles of History, Sulai Lopez; Escape the Night, Olivia Hines; Miss 2059, Jennifer Newman; The Sorry Girls, Kelsey MacDermaid and Becky Wright
Directing	Editing
**Oscar's Hotel for Fantastical Creatures, PJ Liguori**; AVbyte, Antonius and Vijay Nazareth; The Fourth Door, Tony Valenzuela; Jack & Dean of All Trades, Jack Howard and Matt Holt; The Parallax Theory, Sawyer Hartman	**Casey Neistat, Casey Neistat**; Double Digits: The Story of a Neighborhood Movie Star, Justin Johnson; Epic Rap Battles of History, Nice Peter, Andrew Sherman, Ryan Moulton, Josh Best and Javi Sánchez Blanco; Kids React, Daniel Seibert, Jordan Towles, Alyssa Salter, Cara Bomar, Luke Braun, Benny Fine and Rafi Fine; RocketJump: The Show, Erin Willets, Nathan Koepp and Dominick Rolandelli
Visual and Special Effects	Writing
**Corridor Digital, Sam Gorski, Niko Pueringer, and Jake Watson**; Action Movie Kid, Daniel Hashimoto; RocketJump, Eli Cuevas and Clinton Jones; SoKrispyMedia, Sam Wickert; Super Power Beat Down, Nikolay Zamkovoy	**Honest Trailers, Spencer Gilbert, Joe Starr, Dan Murrell, and Andy Signore**; Epic Rap Battles of History, EpicLLOYD, Nice Peter, Zach Sherwin, Dante Cimadamore and Mike Betette; Good Mythical Morning, Drew Champion, Edward Coleman, Lizzie Bassett, Kevin Kostelnik, Daniela Hamilton, and Chase Hilt; Pound House, Brent Weinbach and Doug Lussenhop
CAMPAIGNS
Brand Campaign	Social Good Campaign
**Writing with Grace, Grace Helbig (AT&T)**; Calvin Klein Jeans Spring 2016, Cameron Dallas (Calvin Klein); Make My Monday, Shaun “Shonduras” McBride (AT&T); Now Add A Dancer, Dominic “D-trix” Sandoval (Mountain Dew); Royal Crush, AwesomenessTV (Royal Caribbean)	**Lilly Singh's #GirlLove Challenge**; Matt Damon Pranks People with Surprise Bourne Spy Mission (Omaze for Water.org); #OwnYourVoice: Standing Up for Gender Equality (United Nations Sustainable Development Goals Action Campaign); Prank it FWD; #ProudToBe: Coming Together to Celebrate Identity

=== Web series with multiple nominations and awards ===
Web series that received multiple nominations
Nominations	Web Series
4	Epic Rap Battles of History
4	Oscar's Hotel for Fantastical Creatures
3	Camp Unplug
3	Electra Woman and Dyna Girl
3	Good Mythical Morning
3	McJuggerNuggets' Psycho Series
3	Miss 2059
2	Daily Bumps
2	Devin Super Tramp
2	Escape the Night
2	Foursome
2	fouseyTUBE
2	The Fourth Door
2	The Game Theorists
2	Jack & Dean of All Trades
2	Making Moves
2	MatPat's Game Lab
2	Miranda Sings
2	The Parallax Theory
2	The Philip DeFranco Show
2	shonduras
2	SkyDoesMinecraft
2	The Try Guys
2	The Young Turks

Web series that received multiple awards
Awards	Web Series
3	Oscar's Hotel for Fantastical Creatures
2	The Philip DeFranco Show

== Reception ==
Writing for Teen Vogue, Brianna Wiest called the show "filled with amazing guests, emotional tributes, and some seriously well-deserved winners." Wiest also positively viewed the tribute to Christina Grimmie writing "It seems everyone is holding true to their word of making sure she isn't forgotten, and she deserves nothing less" and highlighting Shane Dawson's speech during the ceremony. Madeline Roth of MTV News also praised the tribute saying "Grimmie's Streamy Awards salute comes after both the Emmys and the Teen Choice Awards faced backlash from fans for not honoring the late singer. Finally, she's gotten the tribute she deserves." According to Liz Shannon Miller of IndieWire, "The show featured a number of breakout performance moments, including an emotional tribute to the late Christina Grimmie, an exuberant musical number by Spencer Ludwig and Streamys 2015 winner James Van Der Beek showing off his dance moves". Mikey Glazer of TheWrap described Jon Cozart's musical sketch satirizing social networks as a "comedy highlight of the night".

Casey Neistat, winner of the First Person award, said of the event "The beauty of it is that reality TV – the messages, the ideas, the narratives that were communicated – were always filtered through TV producers. But now, creators that are nominated for this award ... we are telling our own stories. I think there's so much integrity in that then having them sort of be dictated by others whose interests may not align." Kandee Johnson, who won in the Beauty category, also praised the event, saying "This is like the Oscars of the Internet. We really get no awards, everyone is like 'oh that little YouTube thing you do.' They look at like a joke. It's nice, someone thinks we are valuable." YouTuber Hazel Hayes criticized the lack of female nominees in a tweet saying "A few people pointed out that there are no women nominated for best director at the Streamys. Same with best writer. Little bit sad to see."

The show had a 51% increase in its livestreamed viewership compared to the previous year and a high level of social media engagement.

== See also ==
- List of Streamy Award winners
