= Chris Kendall (disambiguation) =

Chris Kendall is a rugby league referee.

Other people with the same name include:

- Chris Kendall, television director; see Unreported World
- Chris "Crabstickz" Kendall, YouTuber and actor, and winner of a Streamy Award for Oscar's Hotel for Fantastical Creatures
