= SkyDoesMinecraft =

American YouTuber (born 1993)

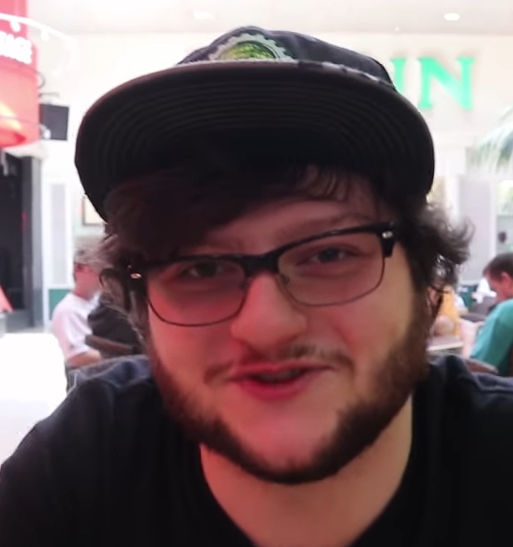
- Dahlberg in 2017
- Born: Adam Arthur Dahlberg; January 17, 1993 (age 33)
- Other names: Sky Does Everything; NetNobody
- Occupation: YouTuber

YouTube information
- Channel: Sky Does Everything
- Years active: 2011–2021
- Genre: Gaming
- Subscribers: 10.8 million
- Views: 3.84 billion
- Last updated: June 1, 2026

Adam Arthur Dahlberg (born January 17, 1993), known online as SkyDoesMinecraft, Sky Does Everything and NetNobody, is an American YouTuber mainly known for formerly producing family-friendly content related to Minecraft. First joining the platform in 2011, Dahlberg later signed a deal with Machinima, Inc. and joined a group of YouTubers known as Team Crafted (later rebranded to Vision Squad). Dahlberg reached ten million subscribers by 2015, and was one of the most popular channels on YouTube at that time.

In 2017, Dahlberg retired from Minecraft content to pursue music creation, criticizing the community and stating their discomfort with continuing to create family-friendly content. In 2022, they unsuccessfully tried to sell their channel amidst personal controversy. The next year, they resumed uploading content to their channel.

== Career ==
Dahlberg first started creating YouTube content in 2011, when they were a teenager. They primarily created content on Minecraft, including gameplay and music videos. Their most viewed video was a parody of Coldplay's "Paradise", titled "New World". By 2013, Dahlberg had signed a deal with Machinima, Inc. Most of Dahlberg's content was noted to be family-friendly. Dahlberg was also a member of a group known as Team Crafted, a group of Minecraft YouTubers founded in 2013. In 2016, the team was rebranded as Vision Squad. In 2014, Dahlberg also appeared in the music video for Lady Gaga's 2014 single "G.U.Y.". In August 2014, it was reported that the Food and Drug Administration had hired Dahlberg to produce an anti-smoking video using Minecraft.

By 2015, Dahlberg had amassed ten million subscribers on YouTube. Their channel was often the most-watched YouTube channel of the week as early as 2013. In September 2015, Business Insider reported that Dahlberg had become the 11th most popular YouTuber on the site with 11.3 million subscribers. Earlier that year, toys produced by Jazwares based on Dahlberg's Minecraft avatar were sold in stores such as Toys "R" Us. In 2016, Dahlberg was nominated for Streamy Awards in the Entertainer of the Year and Gaming categories.

In July 2017, Dahlberg announced in two videos that they were retiring from making Minecraft content, saying that they had become unhappy with the state of the game's community over the past couple of years and that they were no longer comfortable making family-friendly content. They said that they were moving their content creation to a new, music-focused channel called "NetNobody", and that the SkyDoesMinecraft channel would be converted into "a portal for community creations", with creators able to earn a percentage of the revenue generated by videos; YouTube-tracking website Social Blade estimated that each video published on the channel generated thousands of U.S. dollars.

In September 2023, Dahlberg announced their return to uploading content on the SkyDoesMinecraft channel (now known as Sky Does Everything), though with less of a focus on content creation.

== Personal life ==
Dahlberg was born on January 17, 1993, and lives in the U.S. state of Washington. They identify as non-binary, and use they/them pronouns.

In 2016, Dahlberg revealed that they had been suffering from bulimia nervosa for three years. They said that the disorder had taken a toll on their mental and physical health. They then announced that they would spend a few months at a clinic in Washington, and that from that point forward, ten percent of their merchandise sales would be donated to recovery clinics.

In January 2022, Dahlberg's ex-partner, who went by Elizabeth and did not publish any further details for privacy reasons, published a letter onto iCloud accusing Dahlberg of abusing and manipulating her. When requested to comment on the truth of the allegations by DramaAlert, Dahlberg replied that it was "a mix". Following the allegations, Dahlberg placed the SkyDoesMinecraft and Sky Vs Games channels up for sale on Fameswap in June 2022, with SkyDoesMinecraft listed at $900,000. Each was advertised as being wiped of all content upon being sold and promoted as having permissions to livestream and monetize content. Rich Stanton of PC Gamer wrote that selling a YouTube channel that was monetized was against the YouTube terms of service. Reportedly no offers were made to purchase either channel.
