= Boogie2988 =

American YouTube personality (born 1974)

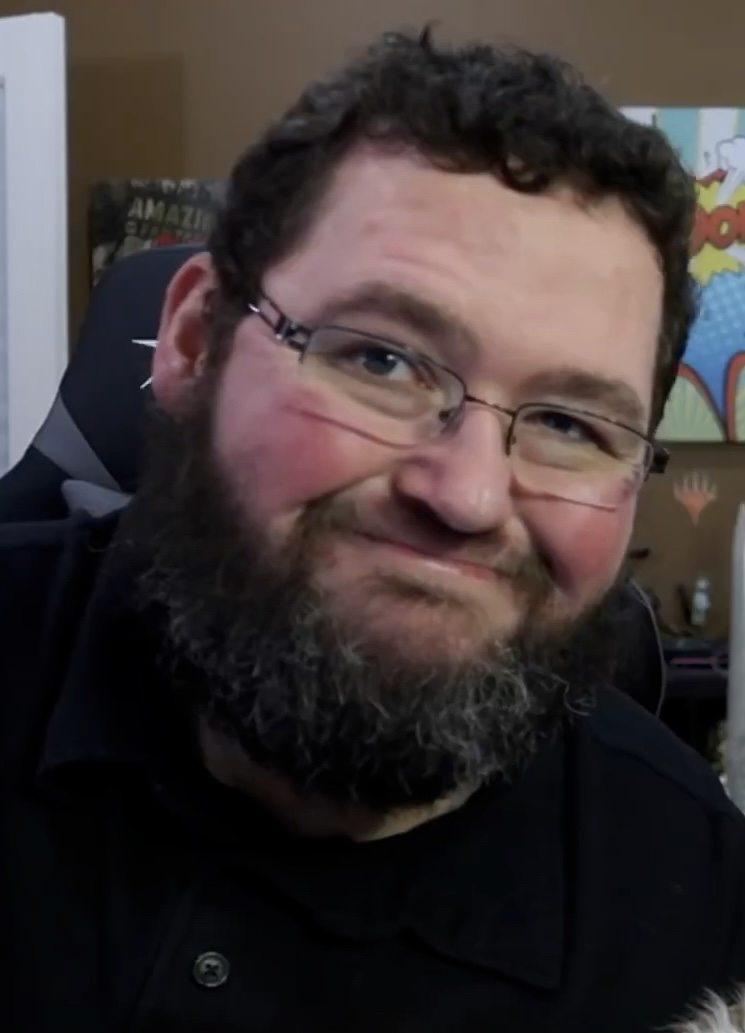
- Williams in 2018
- Born: Steven Jason Williams; July 24, 1974 (age 52); Abingdon, Virginia, U.S.
- Other name: Boogie
- Occupation: YouTuber
- Spouse: Desiree Williams (m. 2013; div. 2018)
- Partner(s): Deziree Davis (2023–present; engaged)

YouTube information
- Channel: boogie2988
- Years active: 2006–present
- Genres: Gaming; comedy
- Subscribers: 3.85 million
- Views: 967 million
- Last updated: October 18, 2026

Steven Jason Williams (born July 24, 1974), better known by his online alias Boogie2988 or simply Boogie, is an American YouTuber. He is best known for his video rants about video games and nerd culture under a fictionalized persona named Francis in addition to numerous controversies in his career.

== Early life and education ==
Steven Jason Williams grew up in St. Paul, Virginia. His father was a coal miner, and his mother was a preschool teacher. He has two older siblings.

Williams described his childhood as a "sad" time period in his life, due to dealing with obesity, lack of friends, and suffering verbal and physical abuse from his mother. Despite this, he considers her death in 2009 to be the "saddest moment" of his life. He had already been depressed due to his father dying of cancer.

Williams graduated from St. Paul High School in Virginia and attended University of Virginia's College at Wise but did not graduate. He later moved to Fayetteville, Arkansas, where he did not leave his home for seven years while being financially supported by a friend. It was then that he discovered YouTube and started to create videos, which he said "gave [his] life a meaning."

== YouTube career ==
The Francis character is based on stereotypes of nerdy video game players and often parodies trending video game news, reaction, and culture. Williams based the character on his early life experiences and has said that he wants viewers to hate the character for embodying gamer stereotypes. Williams' videos range from absurd rants to serious discussions on daily life, such as the ethics of paid promotion on YouTube channels, and his experiences with mental health.

Williams won the Trending Gamer award at The Game Awards 2016.

In June 2016, Williams' YouTube account was temporarily closed due to an anonymous hacker. The unidentified person got hold of his phone number via Verizon during his time at VidCon and was able to gain access to his accounts associated with it, including his YouTube channel. His channel was restored less than a week later.

On May 13, 2023, Williams faced Call of Duty streamer WingsOfRedemption, better known as Jordie Jordan, in a boxing match on the preliminary card of MF & DAZN: X Series 007. Williams lost the fight via TKO in the second round.

In November 2023, Williams appeared in a feature-length documentary by independent filmmaker Mike Clum, which analyzed his downfall as well as his financial situation.

From 2023 to 2026, Williams co-hosted Lolcow Live, a podcast created by fellow internet personality Keemstar, who also co-hosts the show, alongside WingsOfRedemption. In August of 2026, Williams stated that he had left Lolcow Live, citing burnout and the pressure of being a "liability" to the channel.

=== Controversies ===
In October 2018, Williams faced scrutiny due to his relationship with the controversial counseling service BetterHelp. He and other YouTubers sponsored by the service were accused of profiting from mental illness. Williams terminated his partnership with the company, posted a public apology, and said that he would donate his profits to the National Suicide Prevention Lifeline and St. Jude Children's Research Hospital.

On June 24, 2019, while streaming an IRL Twitch vlog with McJuggerNuggets, Williams joked about Etika being the murderer in a proposed interactive murder mystery series. The two men were riffing back and forth about the stream actually being a new scripted series. During which, Williams jumped in to build upon an idea that Ridgeway had said stating "And then, the phone hits the ground, and Etika shows up and goes, ‘surprise, bitch!’," His viewers that were watching felt the joke was insensitive considering the uncertainty of Etika who had been declared missing the week prior. Williams later posted an apology on his Twitter the next day on June 25 stating his intention was give hope that Etika was alive and that he had nothing but love and respect for him and his audience who were worried about his whereabouts. Etika was later found dead that same day by the New York Police Department, his death ruled a suicide-by-drowning.

In August 2019, Williams made a controversial statement against his internet trolls where he claimed "I think that there are rapists and Nazis out there who ... are more redeemable than you because at least they're doing something they believe in."

==== Alleged cancer diagnosis ====
On November 15, 2022, Williams published a video on his YouTube channel stating that he had been diagnosed with a rare blood cancer known as polycythemia vera, which is a genetic condition causing overproduction of red blood cells, in turn causing blood to thicken and increasing the risk of blood clots, stroke, or heart attack. During Coffeezilla's discussion with Williams regarding Faddy Coin, Williams stated that a majority of the money he made had been put to helping treat the condition.

On July 10, 2024, Williams was confronted on a live podcast by political streamer Steven Bonnell, known as Destiny, who alleged Williams was lying about having cancer. Bonnell alleged that the circumstances Williams claimed about his diagnosis did not align with having polycythemia vera, but more closely aligned with secondary polycythemia. In particular, a substantial cause of secondary polycythemia is taking exogenous hormones, aligning with Williams stating that he was undergoing testosterone replacement therapy. Williams also claimed to have sleep apnea, which causes a lack of oxygen intake overnight. This contributes to secondary polycythemia by causing a decrease in oxygen in the blood, which causes the blood to then produce more red blood cells. None of these are primarily consistent with polycythemia vera (which is caused by genetic mutation), but both were cited as contributing causes in Williams’s 2022 announcement video. Bonnell also pointed out that Williams has stated he is waiting on a biopsy to confirm his diagnosis, despite already claiming to be diagnosed.

Later during the livestream, after Bonnell disconnected, Williams released a statement on his Twitter, stating that he has paperwork stating he has polycythemia vera, and saying that his doctor told him he had the condition, but that he should've "never jumped the gun like that" and saying "of all the fuck-ups that I've ever made in this life, this is the one that will haunt me to the bitter end, as it should."

Following this controversy, Williams was fired from a podcast he shares with fellow internet personality Keemstar, Lolcow Live, but was rehired as a host after Williams agreed to tattoo the word "liar" on his face as a punishment.

== Personal life ==
Shortly after his mother's death in 2009, he met a woman called Desiree, "Dez" for short, and she moved to Arkansas to live with him. She later became known in his content as Dez2988, taking on his numerical suffix and occasionally portraying the unseen character of Francis' sister. In October 2013, Williams and Desiree got married. Williams had gastric bypass surgery due to morbid obesity on August 1, 2017. On December 19, 2017, Williams announced that Desiree filed for divorce and had planned to for a while, but waited until he sufficiently recovered from his gastric bypass surgery which was back in August. In October 2018, Williams stated that his divorce was finalized back in February.

On July 11, 2023, Williams announced that he was in a relationship with Deziree Davis. (Note: Not to be confused with the name of his ex-wife, Desiree.) On July 6, 2025, Williams announced the two were engaged.

Williams is a theist.

=== Aggravated assault charge ===
In September 2020, Williams began trending on Twitter after news broke out of an ongoing conflict between him and Frank Hassle, (Note: Hassle, whose real name is Cameron Williams, has no relation to Williams.) a YouTuber who began harassing him over the course of several months after suspecting he was the cause of his channels' termination. After Hassle had made his way down to Williams' home in Arkansas, the two were interviewed by Keemstar, in which Williams threatened to kill Hassle if he stepped on his property. The next day after Hassle showed up at his house wearing a GoPro, Williams pulled out a revolver and fired a "warning shot" into the air, causing Hassle to eventually leave. A police investigation was launched shortly afterwards. On May 7, 2021, a warrant was issued for Williams' arrest on a charge of aggravated assault with a $5,000 bond by the Washington County, Arkansas sheriff's department. Williams turned himself in on May 12, was processed over the course of three hours and posted bail. On March 7, 2022, Williams stated that his case was settled on a deferred adjudication. Hassle, meanwhile, was never criminally charged for his involvement in the incident.

== Filmography ==
=== Commercial ===
Year	Company / Brand	Role	Notes
2013	Volkswagen	Francis / Himself	Super Bowl commercial

=== Television ===
Year	Title	Role	Notes
2014	Supersize vs Superskinny	Himself	1 episode

=== Web ===
Year	Title	Role	Notes
2014	Did You Know Gaming?	Himself	Episode: Skyrim
2015	Your Grammar Sucks	Himself	2 episodes
2016	Super Planet Dolan	Himself / Francis (voice)	Episode: What Are Earthquakes Called On Mars?
2016	Crash Zoom	Mancis (voice)	Episode: Sky Scam
2016–2019	Youtubers React	Himself	10 episodes
2017	H3 Podcast	Himself	3 episodes
2018	HowToBasic	Himself	Episode: "Face Reveal"
2018	Sugar Pine 7	Himself	Cameo; Episode: "NSFW work clothes"
2023	The Dark, Sad Life of Boogie2988	Himself	Documentary
2023–2026	Lolcow Live	Himself (co-host)	
2026	The Sick Mind of EDP445	Himself	Documentary

== Exhibition boxing record ==
1 fight	0 wins	1 loss
By knockout	0	1

No.	Result	Record	Opponent	Type	Round, time	Date	Location	Notes
1	Loss	0–1	WingsOfRedemption	TKO	2 (3), 0:29	May 13, 2023	Wembley Arena, London, England	1 minute rounds
