= Adriene Mishler =

American actress, yoga teacher and entrepreneur

- Born: September 29, 1984 (age 42); Austin, Texas, U.S.
- Occupations: Actress; yoga teacher; entrepreneur

YouTube information
- Channel: @yogawithadriene
- Years active: 2012–present
- Genre: How to
- Subscribers: 13.6 million
- Views: 1.73 billion
- Last updated: 23 July 2026
- Website: fwfg.com

Adriene Mishler (born September 29, 1984) is an American yoga instructor, actress, and entrepreneur, based in Austin, Texas. She produces and hosts Yoga With Adriene on YouTube and is co-founder of yoga video subscription service Find What Feels Good.

With over 13 million subscribers and more than 750 videos, Yoga with Adriene ranks in the top 500 most subscribed YouTube channels as of January 2025.

== Biography ==
Mishler was born in Austin, Texas, into an "artsy family". Her mother is of Mexican descent. She began her career as a professional film and television actor, as well as performing as a voiceover artist, but after taking a yoga class at a studio, Mishler had a realization that she wanted everyone she knew to "have this experience [of yoga]", and completed a yoga teacher training course.

== Career ==
Mishler started Yoga With Adriene in 2012, with the help of her producer and business partner Chris Sharpe, whom she met when working as the lead on a horror indie film. Sharpe had already helped create a successful YouTube channel, Hilah Cooking, with his wife, and was keen to apply these skills to the wellness industry.

In 2015, she launched the yoga video subscription service Find What Feels Good.

Mishler first collaborated with Adidas in 2015 as part of their revamp of their women's business, featuring a new focus on female athletes and active personalities. She was part of the "I'm Here to Create" film series and was the face of her own yoga clothing line, as well as a member of the Adidas Women Global Creator Network. Adidas x WANDERLUST launched their FW17 line through an International Yoga Day livestream led by Mishler, attended by over 665,000 people. In 2018, she made a tour of Europe leading yoga mass classes.

From 2015 to 2024, Mishler launched a 30-day yoga challenge to celebrate the new year, releasing one video every day starting on January 1. In 2025, she released a 7-day yoga challenge, as she focused on her personal as well as her team's mental and physical well-being while still continuing the series.

== Reception ==
Mishler's laid back personality and beginner-friendly teaching style has been widely praised in the media, being described by Marisa Meltzer of The Guardian as "the yoga girl next door". Her dog Benji often appears on her videos, next to her mat. In 2015, her channel was the most searched yoga class in Google.

In 2016, she received the Streamy health and well-being prize. In 2018 according to The Guardian, she had 4 million subscribers. During the COVID-19 pandemic, her YouTube channel gained more attention from viewers looking for at-home fitness videos to do while in lockdown. On April 13, 2020, Yoga With Adriene received 1.8 million daily views. In April 2020 her channel had more than 7 million subscribers.

Over the next 5 years that number continued to grow, reaching 13 million by the beginning of 2025.

== Acting ==
- American Crime (2015) – TV series, directed by John Ridley.
- Joe (2013) – film, directed by David Gordon Green.
- Everybody Wants Some!! (2016) – film, directed by Richard Linklater.
- Day 5 (Season 2, 2017) – web television series.

== Voice acting ==
- DC Universe Online – voices Supergirl, Raven and Lois Lane
