= YesJulz =

American social media personality (born 1990)

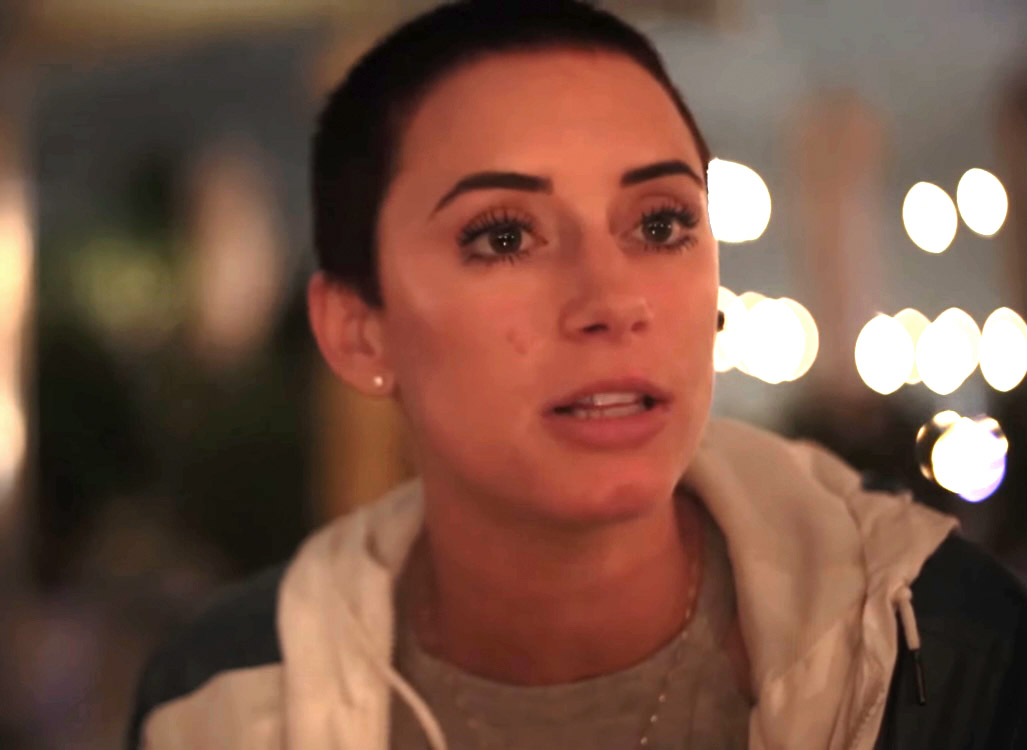
- Goddard in 2015
- Born: Julieanna Marie Goddard; March 2, 1990 (age 36); Miami, Florida, U.S.
- Education: University of South Florida
- Occupation: Talent manager
- Years active: 2014–present
- Children: 1
- Website: www.yesjulz.com

Julieanna Marie Goddard (born March 2, 1990), known professionally as YesJulz, is an American social media personality, talent manager, and entrepreneur.

== Early life and education ==
Julieanna Marie Goddard was born on March 2, 1990, in Miami, Florida. She is of Italian and Puerto Rican descent. She attended the University of South Florida and graduated with a bachelor's degree in broadcast journalism.

== Career ==
YesJulz rose to prominence in 2014, after hosting a Sprite Remix party for LeBron James in Miami. She entered artist management, managing musician 070 Shake, an American rapper who was featured on Kanye West, Pusha T, and Nas' albums. Media outlets have called Julieanna Goddard "the queen of Snapchat" and a "Snapchat 'it' girl." YesJulz also founded 1AM Creative, a female-led creative and consulting agency with clients including Puma and Vevo. In 2015, YesJulz hosted the 1AM party in Los Angeles, which featured artists including Lil Uzi Vert and Wiz Khalifa. She was nominated for Snapchat storyteller on August 24, 2016, at the 6th Streamy Awards.

YesJulz has partnered with brands such as Beats by Dre and Red Bull.

In 2017, she tweeted a photo of a crop top that read "Niggas lie a lot", which sparked controversy. She later apologized.

On April 22, 2022, she had a daughter with NFL player Duke Riley.
