= Jesse Ridgway =

American YouTuber (born 1992)

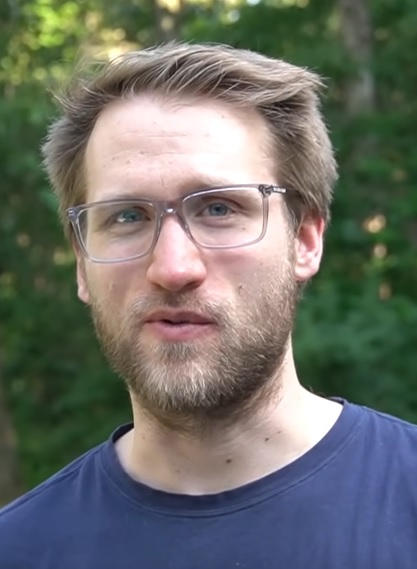
- Ridgway in 2021
- Born: Jesse Ridgeway; September 29, 1992 (age 34)
- Occupation: YouTuber

YouTube information
- Channel: @McJuggerNuggets
- Subscribers: 4.34 million
- Views: 2.32 billion

Jesse Ridgway (born September 29, 1992), also known by his online alias McJuggerNuggets, is an American Youtuber, filmmaker, and actor. Having uploaded content to the site since 2006, he is known for his long-form mockumentary series such as Psycho Series, The Devil Inside, and My Virtual Escape among others.

== Early life ==
Jesse Ridgway was born on September 29, 1992, in New Jersey to Jeffrey Ridgway Sr. and Theresa Ridgway (née Abraham). He attended Arthur P. Schalick High School and later graduated with a bachelor's degree in Radio/TV/Film from Rowan University in 2014.

Ridgway became interested in acting and storytelling at a young age. He has cited television series such as Lost, Prison Break, Breaking Bad, Game of Thrones, and The Walking Dead as influences on his work in acting and filmmaking.

== Career ==
=== Psycho Series ===
Ridgway's most well known series is Psycho Series, a show which depicts dramatic and dysfunctional events between fictional versions of him and his family members. The series generated more than 1.2 billion views on YouTube. Viewers speculated whether the videos were real or fake until 2016, when Ridgway admitted to staging the videos. Many viewers who believed that the incidents between his family were real made a plethora of police reports after an episode titled Psycho Kid Kills Father premiered where Jesse's character murders his father. As a result, Ridgway's house was ultimately visited by police twenty times.

He and his family were the subject of the 2017 mock documentary Psycho Family, directed by fellow YouTuber and Ridgway's future business partner Brian Spitz, produced by Complex Networks, and published by Go90. His YouTube channel has accumulated over 4 million subscribers.

=== Storyfire ===
In July 2017, Ridgway and Spitz launched the app Storyfire, a collaborative storytelling app designed to compete with YouTube. This came after over 500 episodes of his Psycho Series were deemed unsafe for advertisers and in some cases deleted from YouTube, as well as his dissatisfaction with the corportization of the platform. Tubefilter described Storyfire as a hybrid between YouTube, Twitter, and Wattpad, allowing users to pay creators for video and text posts. The platform revolved around its own currency called Blaze, which users could gain by buying directly from Storyfire or by watching ads. Creators could then charge Blaze as a means of charging for access, though making videos freely available was also an option. Storyfire would split 30% of revenue generated from Blaze when cashed out by creators. All content on Storyfire was preapproved before it was uploaded, and video uploads were locked behind a system where creators would pitch their ideas to Storyfire.

Storyfire became trending on the Apple App Store within 36 hours of its launch. Several prominent YouTubers joined the platform, including Boogie2988, Rob Gavagan, and KidBehindACamera. In January 2021, Ridgway announced that Storyfire had failed to find external funding and that he could no longer sustain the costs of running the platform. In April, Storyfire, its branding, and its presence on other social media platforms were sold as an NFT via an auction through OpenSea to a user named Deckchair for 7.9175 Etherium, worth at the time approximately $16,400. Ridgway stated as part of the sales pitch for the auction that he had spent $3 million to develop and maintain the platform.

=== Other projects ===
Ridgway has worked as executive producer on Getting Lost.

Ridgeway released his directorial film debut, Don't Dream About Me, on digital platforms on October 25, 2025. The film reached the top 10 in Apple's Drama Films section within its first week.

In 2018, Ridgway appeared as Jake in two episodes of CBC Television's My 90-Year-Old Roommate.

== Personal life ==
After the COVID-19 pandemic, Ridgway documented a decline in his health due to Long COVID and shared details about people close to him that had died from the disease.

Ridgeway met his wife Ashley Renee on Tinder in 2019. After five years of dating, Ridgeway proposed to her in October of 2024. The two were married in 2025 of the same month.

In May 2026, Ridgeway and his wife announced that they had agreed to an abortion after an amniocentesis test reported that her fetus tested positive for Trisomy 21. The decision was criticized by anti-abortion advocates including U.S. House of Representatives speaker Mike Johnson (R-LA), and by the heads of the National Down Syndrome Society and the National Down Syndrome Congress. They received multiple private letters of support by people who have had similar experiences, as well as threatening messages.

== Awards and nominations ==
Year	Nominated work	Category	Award	Result	Notes	Ref.
2015	Psycho Dad Shreds Video Games	Viral Video	Webby Awards	Honored		
2016	Psycho Series	Show of the Year	6th Streamy Awards	Nominated		
2016	The Psycho Series	Best Drama Series	6th Streamy Awards	Nominated		
2017	McJuggerNuggets	Best Ensemble Cast	7th Streamy Awards	Nominated		
2018	My Virtual Escape	Directing	8th Streamy Awards	Won		
2018	My Virtual Escape	Acting in a Drama	8th Streamy Awards	Nominated	Nomination for Ridgway's acting	
