= PJ Liguori =

British-Italian YouTuber (born 1990)

KickThePj
- Liguori in 2026
- Born: PJ Liguori; 11 December 1990 (age 35); Peterborough, Cambridgeshire, England
- Education: University for the Creative Arts (BA)
- Occupations: YouTuber; Filmmaker
- Partner: Sophie Newton

YouTube information
- Channel: KickThePj
- Years active: 2007–present
- Subscribers: 1.28 million
- Views: 125 million
- Last updated: 15 September 2025

PJ Liguori (born 11 December 1990) is a British YouTuber and filmmaker. He (Note: Liguori uses both he/him and they/them pronouns. This article uses he/him for consistency.) is best known for his YouTube channel KickThePj. Liguori specialises in different artistic areas, including screenplay, directing, songwriting, acting, producing, editing, sound, art, crafts, and animation. His work includes the web series Oscar's Hotel for Fantastical Creatures (2015), and the shorts The Forever Train (2013) and The Lost Buoy (2022).

== Early and personal life ==
Liguori was born in Peterborough, Cambridgeshire, England to an Italian family. He has a sister.

Growing up, Liguori was interested in drama and made home videos with his friends. He took a gap year before going on to graduate with a Bachelor of Arts with Honours in Digital Film and Screen Arts in 2013 from the University for the Creative Arts in Farnham, Surrey. It was here he met other creatives such as Sophie Newton, Jamie Swarbrick, and Louis Grant, whom he would collaborate with on several projects.

Liguori became a British citizen in March 2015. He is based in Brighton.

== Career ==
Liguori uploaded his first video, which featured him playing guitar, in early 2007 at the age of 16. On 7 October 2011, Liguori released an album titled Stories from Somewhere. The album is a collection of short stories told in song.

In November 2012, Liguori won a Virgin Media Award for his short film PJ, Tiny Planet Explorer. Liguori appeared in two episodes of Benjamin Cook's 2013 web documentary series Becoming YouTube.

Liguori was awarded for Best Director for his film series Oscar's Hotel for Fantastical Creatures in the 2016 Streamy Awards. The series was also nominated for Series of the Year in the 2016 British Online Creator Awards (BONCAs), and Liguori was nominated for British Creator of the Year.

In 2018, Liguori staged two 'work in progress' live shows in his hometown of Brighton, revealing later that they were test shows for a planned live tour of the UK. In September and early October of that year, Liguori travelled to twelve separate cities with his show 'Space Trip', a live storytelling event based around the fictional planet Kazam and its dangerous inhabitants. The show featured three guest stars: Dean Dobbs, Bertie Gilbert, and Chris Kendall, all of whom have collaborated with Liguori in the past.

Liguori started regularly streaming on Twitch in 2018. He directed the 2019 music video for Dodie Clark's single, "Monster".

== Filmography ==
=== Oscar's Hotel for Fantastical Creatures ===
In late 2014, Liguori partnered with New Form Digital to create a 10 minute short film pilot entitled Oscar's Hotel for Fantastical Creatures. The film follows a young man named Oliver who goes to visit his uncle's hotel, which turns out to host unusual guests: monsters. A particular monster suddenly wreaks havoc in the hotel, and Oliver – amongst newfound friends – conquer the beast. Liguori announced in April 2015 that Oscar's Hotel would be funded and picked up as a six-episode web series by Vimeo, entitled Oscar's Hotel for Fantastical Creatures. The series was produced by New Form Digital and The Jim Henson Company. The first episode of the web series aired on Vimeo on 15 September 2015, and one episode aired per week over the course of six weeks. In December 2024, the series was uploaded to YouTube on his side channel.

=== Colour Bandits ===
In June 2013, Liguori released a video on his YouTube channel by the title Colour Bandits. This film depicts Liguori as a 'Colour Bandit' wearing all white and caked in white makeup. The film was developed by PJ Liguori, Sophie Newton, Jamie Swarbrick, and Louis Grant.

=== The Forever Train ===
In October 2013, Liguori released a short 8 minute film entitled The Forever Train. This short film was created by PJ Liguori, Sophie Newton, Jamie Swarbrick, and Louis Grant. The film tells the story of a passenger (played by YouTuber Chris Kendall) on 'The Forever Train', a train that travels through time. While on board, the passenger has humorous interactions with the fellow monsters and creatures as he tries to find his suitcase and ticket. Several other YouTubers acted in this film, including Thomas Ridgewell, Daniel Howell, Phil Lester, and Dodie Clark.

=== The Lost Buoy ===
In August 2022, Liguori released a 10-minute short film titled The Lost Buoy. The film follows a small buoy as he makes his way across the vast ocean, meeting various characters along the way. It was Liguori's first 3D animated film, and it premiered at the 2022 Buffer Festival in Toronto, where it won the award for Excellence in Sound & Score.

== Awards and nominations ==
Year	Show	Award	Nominee	Result	Ref.
2012	Virgin Media Awards	People’s Choice Award	PJ, Tiny Planet Explorer	Won	
2016	Summer in the City Awards	Short Film of the Year	Hair and Brimstone	Nominated	
2016	Streamy Awards	Ensemble Cast	Oscar's Hotel for Fantastical Creatures	Nominated	
2016	Streamy Awards	Directing	Oscar's Hotel for Fantastical Creatures	Won	
2016	British Online Creator Awards	Series of the Year	Oscar's Hotel for Fantastical Creatures	Nominated	
2016	British Online Creator Awards	Creator of the Year	Himself	Nominated	
2017	Summer in the City Awards	Artisan Award	Himself	Nominated	
2018	Summer in the City Awards	Creator Video of the Year	OCEAN KID	Nominated	
2022	Buffer Festival Awards	Excellence in Sound & Score	The Lost Buoy	Won	
