= Day 5 =

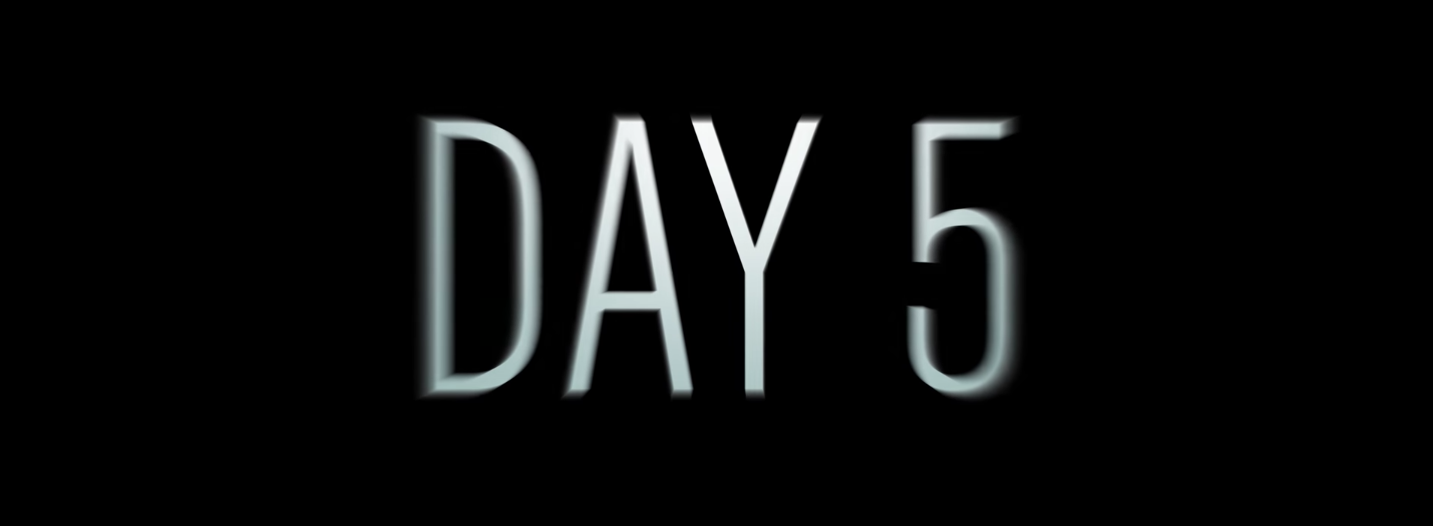
- Genre: Post-Apocalyptic; Drama; Thriller
- Created by: Burnie Burns; Matt Hullum; Josh Flanagan; Chris Demarais
- Starring: Jesse C. Boyd; Walker Satterwhite; Stephanie Drapeau; Davi Jay
- Music by: Graham Reynolds
- Country of origin: United States
- Original language: English
- No. of seasons: 2
- No. of episodes: 14

Production
- Executive producers: Burnie Burns; Matt Hullum
- Producers: Ezra Venetos; Doreen Copeland
- Production location: Austin, Texas
- Running time: 40–49 minutes
- Production company: Rooster Teeth

Original release
- Network: Rooster Teeth
- Release: June 19, 2016 – September 24, 2017

Day 5 is an American post-apocalyptic drama web series created by Burnie Burns, Matt Hullum, Josh Flanagan, and Chris Demarais. It premiered on Rooster Teeth's website on June 19, 2016. New episodes premiered exclusively on Rooster Teeth site via their paid sponsorship program, FIRST. Announced March 11, 2016, it was noted for being a dramatic departure from Rooster Teeth's typically comedic productions.

The series follows a junkie, Jake (Jesse C. Boyd), who emerges after a drug binge only to learn that most of humanity has died after falling asleep. Jake and a small group of survivors search for the cause of the mysterious "sleep epidemic".

== Development ==
The concept had been in development since 2011 and was originally envisioned as a feature film, then a 45-minute short before becoming a six-episode series. According to Flanagan, "The original concept was [co-founder] Burnie Burns'. He was trying to come up with a way to make an apocalyptic story on a lower budget. [...] So it was approached from a budgetary level from the very beginning but it's such a relatable thing because everyone knows what it's like to be this ridiculously tired."

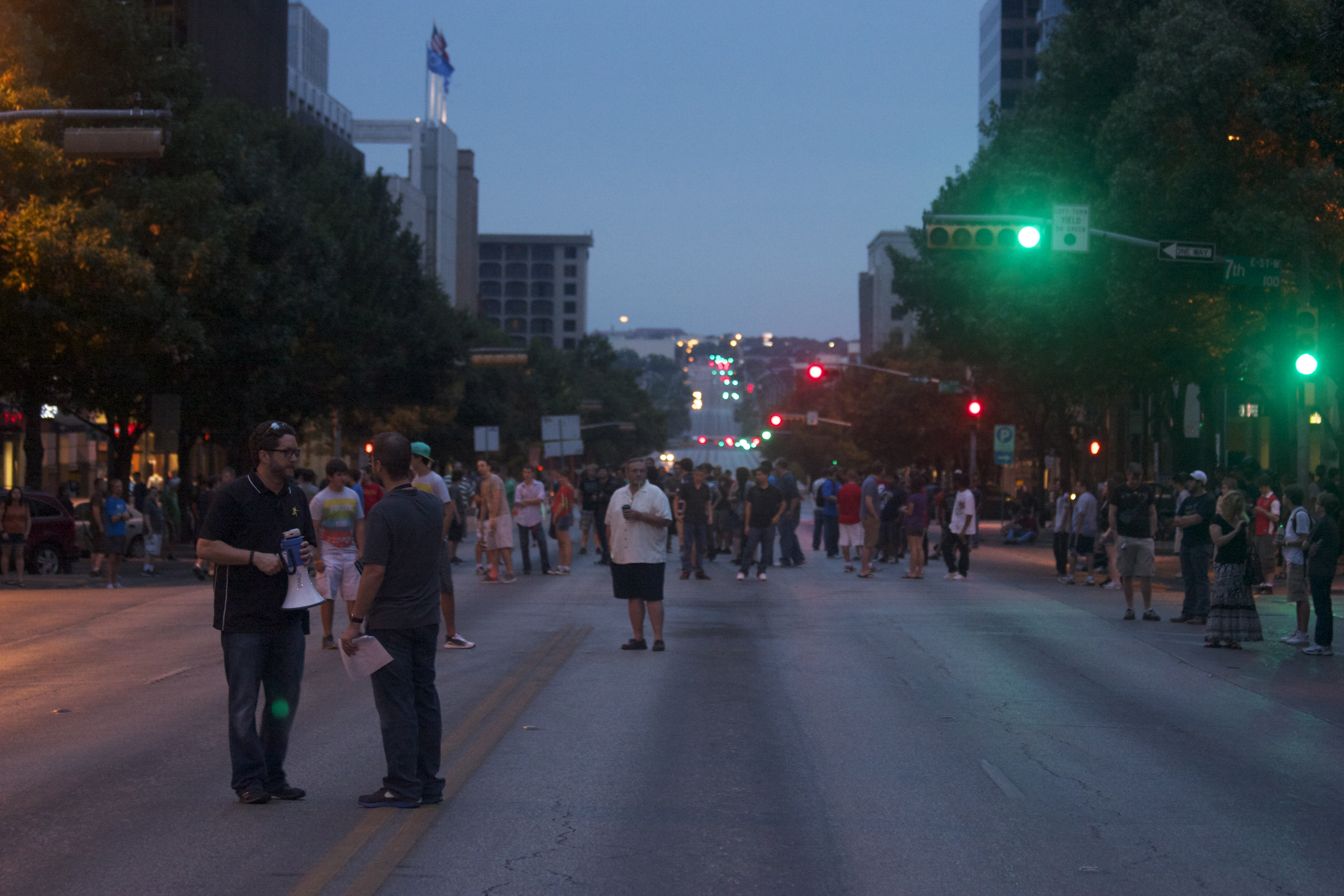
1,800 RTX 2012 attendees filled Congress Avenue as extras for a scene being filmed.

A scene was filmed during RTX 2012, and involved shutting down downtown Congress Avenue and 1,800 attendees.

The 8-episode second season premiered on August 6, 2017. It features guest stars William Sadler and Jake Busey, along with new recurring cast members Ryan Cooper, Electra Avellan, and Adriene Mishler.

A third season was originally set to premiere sometime in 2019, with the first two seasons being removed from Rooster Teeth first and syndicated to television networks for a six-month window instead. The two seasons have since been returned to the site after their broadcasts. On December 12, 2019, Flanagan announced on Twitter that he was no longer a full-time employee of Rooster Teeth, and confirmed that he did not have any future seasons of Day 5 in development at that time; while they had not been officially canceled, he stated, "I feel it's very unlikely they'll ever return as direct continuations.

== Cast and characters ==
=== Introduced in Season 1 ===
- Jesse C. Boyd as Jake, a meth addict who is one of the survivors of the apocalypse and is the main protagonist of the series. Boyd was attracted to the writing from his first audition, particularly its balance between humor and "high-stakes" moments.
- Walker Satterwhite as Sam, a 13 year-old boy who is one of the survivors of the epidemic.
- Stephanie Drapeau as Ally, a night shift doctor who is one of the survivors of the epidemic and is set on finding a cure.
- Davi Jay as Ellis, a pilot who is one of the survivors of the epidemic.
- Shannon McCormick as Dr. Abrams. Initially an antagonist to the group when he planned to test an experimental sleep drug on Sam that had killed numerous other test subjects, he forms a grudging alliance with them in their search for the source of the apocalypse. (season 2; guest season 1)
- Katie Folger as Meredith. An enigmatic assassin initially introduced as an ally to Ellis but eventually revealed to be directly involved with the group behind the sleep apocalypse.
- Lee Eddy as Lex, another doctor who survives and is actively looking for a cure with Dr. Abrams. She and Ally dated prior to the epidemic.
- Joel Heyman as Bill Beavers, a man with a rare disease that makes it impossible for him to sleep: initially considered a death sentence with a life-expectancy of six months, Bill faces the very real possibility he will be the last man on Earth. (regular season 2; guest season 1)
  - Bill was the main character of the original unreleased Day 5 short. Flanagan and Demarais later decided that though he made sense as the main character of that particular story, it would be too difficult to make the entire series about him; thus, Bill's story was adapted into an episode of the first season before he joined the supporting cast in Season 2.
- Jason Liebrecht as Colin (season 1)
- Joe Estevez as Alonzo Alvarez, a local TV reporter driven mad by his commitment to staying on the air. (season 1)

=== Introduced in Season 2 ===
- Adriene Mishler as Gabbi, a survivor in search of the source of the sleep apocalypse who ends up joining Jake, Sam, Ally, and Ellis's group.
- Ryan Cooper as Aidan, an Australian pilot whom Ellis meets early on during the sleep apocalypse, searching for the supposed Sandman's Oasis where people are able to sleep.
- Electra Avellan as Paula, a mother who survived the sleep apocalypse along with her son Angel. Allies with Aidan in their attempt to get into the Sandman's Oasis.

=== Guests/recurring characters ===
- Alisha Revel as Sarah, Ally's assistant who joins the survivor group at the start of the series but succumbs to the apocalypse after losing her drugs at the rave. Haunts Jake's nightmares. (season 1)
- Barbara Dunkelman as Flip, a mysterious drug dealer at the morgue who causes Jake to relapse and often appears in his nightmares. (season 1)
- Garrett Graham as Dave, an office worker driven mad by the death of his dog, becomes a threat to the survivors as a phenomenon called the "Incubus", where he can only stay awake by inflicting pain on himself and murdering other survivors. (season 1)
- Caiti Ward as Emily, one of Ally's co-workers who set out early during the apocalypse to try to establish a hospital network for survivors, but is killed by the Incubus while traveling through Austin. Subject of the short "Number 27". (season 1)
- Kaci Beeler as Number 27, a smartphone-obsessed survivor Emily encounters in an abandoned hospital. The short "Number 27" is named after her character. (season 1)
- Jen Brown as Beth, one of the survivors Ellis teams up with in Austin. (season 1)
- Ron Weisberg as Allister, Meredith's apparent superior, part of the organization behind the sleep apocalypse. (season 2)
- Jeremy Vandermause as Tripp, a Silicon Valley hopeful who discovers and helps establish "the Sandman's Oasis" where people are able to sleep, although he soon grows to abuse his power. (season 2)
- Jake Busey as Carl, an insane soldier who believes the "cure" to the apocalypse is giving all survivors a lobotomy. (season 2)
- William Sadler as Bob, a seemingly normal man who has earned mythical status as "the Sandman", (named for the folkloric creature) due to his apparent ability to allow people to sleep. (season 2)
- Tristan Alijah Garcia as Angel. Paula's son, survived the apocalypse by staying up late after bedtime. (season 2)
- Chris Demarais as Sebastian, a survivor living in the desert who helps suicidal survivors go out as spectacularly as possible. (season 2)

=== Rooster Teeth employee cameos ===
- Gavin Free as Morgue Raver, who Sam witnesses crawl into one of the cold chambers with pillow in hand and promptly fall asleep.
- Josh Flanagan as Mark, a guard at the hospital in Austin.
- Aaron Marquis as Skinemax Star No. 2 (season 1) and museum narrator (season 2)
- Matt Hullum as Dale, Sam's affable father, who was asleep on the couch at the time the apocalypse started after catching Sam staying up late.
- Anna Hullum as Jake's mother.
- Blaine Gibson as Blaze, part of Jeffery's D&D team.
- Adam Ellis as Gamer 2, another member of Jeffery's D&D team.
- Samantha Ireland as Amy, a staff member at the station. Stars in the short "Making Headlines".
- Ashley Jenkins as U.S. Reporter.

== Episodes ==
=== Season 1 (2016) ===
No. overall	No. in season	Title	Directed by	Written by	Original release date
1	1	"Waking Nightmare"	Josh Flanagan	Josh Flanagan and Chris Demarais	June 19, 2016
After a two day drug binge, meth addict Jake awakes to find himself a survivor of an unknown apocalyptic event spurred when sleep becomes deadly.
2	2	"Cognitive Dissonance"	Josh Flanagan	Josh Flanagan and Chris Demarais	June 26, 2016
Ellis's plan hits a snag, just in time for some sleepless delirium to settle in.
3	3	"Night Terrors"	Mark Bristol	Mark Bristol	July 3, 2016
As Ellis heads for Dallas, Ally, Jake, and Sam are diverted by a new kind of foe.
4	4	"Sweet Dreams"	Chris Demarais	Josh Flanagan and Chris Demarais	July 17, 2016
New clues converge in Dallas, while Ally attempts a dangerous reunion in Austin.
5	5	"Beacons in the Dark"	Aaron Marquis	Aaron Marquis	July 24, 2016
Lex shows her research to Ally; Ellis investigates a mysterious signal.
6	6	"Wide Awake"	Todd McMullen	Josh Flanagan, Chris Demarais and Mark Bristol	July 31, 2016
In the season finale, alliances at Dr. Abrams' facility are pushed to a breaking point; Ellis' group puts their theory to the test.

=== Season 2 (2017) ===
The second season debuted on August 6, 2017, and is 8 episodes long.

No. overall	No. in season	Title	Directed by	Written by	Original release date
7	1	"Manifest Destiny"	Josh Flanagan	Josh Flanagan & Katrina Albright	August 6, 2017
Ellis finds his way to an aerodrome, meeting Aiden, who is being held at gunpoint and made to fly a light plane.
8	2	"Oasis"	Max Nichols	Josh Flanagan & Katrina Albright	August 13, 2017
The team hunts for Gabbi – and any chance to hunt down the sleep zone – as Aidan and a new ally attempt to enter The Sandman's Oasis.
9	3	"Lucid"	Aaron Marquis	Aaron Marquis	August 20, 2017
As Aidan and Paula explore the camp, Jake and company battle a new threat with an inventive method for staying awake.
10	4	"Circadian Rhythms"	Stewart Thorndike	Chris Demaris & Jason Romaine	August 27, 2017
Tensions flare and complications arise on the flight to Nevada. Aidan attempts to meet The Sandman himself.
11	5	"Sleepwalkers"	Chris Demarais	Chris Demarais, Aaron Marquis, & Levi Bailey	September 3, 2017
The team pursues The Oasis through the desert. As Aidan navigates the politics of the camp, Meredith finds a new ally in her unlikely assignment.
12	6	"Parasomnia"	Aaron Marquis	Chris Demarais & Aaron Marquis	September 10, 2017
As the fractured teams close in on the camp, a chance encounter pushes one hero to the breaking point. Aidan's actions at The Oasis have unexpected consequences.
13	7	"Apnea"	Josh Flanagan	Aaron Marquis & Josh Flanagan	September 17, 2017
Forces converge on The Oasis and the battle for the sleep zone begins.
14	8	"Dawn"	Josh Flanagan	Unknown	September 24, 2017
The morning comes with revelations and consequences.
