= Shonduras =

American Mormon gamer, social media figure, and businessman

- Born: Shaun Todd McBride; 7 July 1987 (age 39); West Point, Utah, U.S.
- Spouse: Jenny McBride (m. 2010)
- Children: 4(including A for Adley)

YouTube information
- Channel: Shonduras
- Years active: 2014–present
- Subscribers: 5.30 million
- Views: 4.27 billion
- Last updated: August 8, 2025
- Website: www.shonduras.com

Shaun Todd McBride (born July 7, 1987), known professionally as Shonduras, is an American internet personality. He is best known for Snapchat and YouTube.

== Career ==
After creating a Snapchat account in 2014, Shonduras became one of Snapchat's first content creators to gain a following. Shonduras participated in "SnapperHero," Snapchat's first original series. In 2017, he was listed as one of Forbes's "30 under 30" in the category of Marketing and Advertising.

== Nominations and awards ==
In the 5th annual Streamy Awards, Shonduras was nominated for both "Best Short Form Creativity" and "Best Snapchat Storyteller." SnapperHero, which he participated in, won the Streamy Award for "Best Short Form Creativity." In both the 5th and 6th annual Streamy Awards, he won the "Snapchat Storyteller" Streamy award. In the 7th annual Shorty Awards, Shonduras was a finalist in "The Best Snapchatter" category. In 2016, he was nominated in The Ghosties for both "Snapchatter of the Year" and "Best Storyteller", he won the "Snapchatter of the Year" Ghostie award.
