= Coach Snoop =

- Genre: Documentary
- Starring: Snoop Dogg
- Country of origin: United States
- Original language: English
- No. of seasons: 1
- No. of episodes: 8

Production
- Running time: 28–30 min.

Original release
- Network: Netflix
- Release: February 2, 2018

Coach Snoop is a 2018 American docu-series, following hip-hop artist Snoop Dogg as he coaches his youth team Snoop's Steelers in the Snoop Youth Football League (SYFL).

== Premise ==
Coach Snoop follows Snoop Dogg as he coaches his youth team Snoop's Steelers in the Snoop Youth Football League (SYFL). The SYFL was set up by Snoop Dogg in 2005 as an after school programme in the Los Angeles area to keep kids stay focused on their goals.

== Cast ==
- Snoop Dogg

== Release ==
The series was released on February 2, 2018 on Netflix streaming platform.
