= Oscar's Hotel for Fantastical Creatures =

British-American fantasy comedy web series

- Genre: Fantasy; Comedy
- Created by: PJ Liguori; Sophie Newton; Louis Grant; Jamie Swarbrick
- Written by: PJ Liguori; Sophie Newton; Louis Grant; Jamie Swarbrick
- Directed by: PJ Liguori
- Starring: Andrew Ableson; Chris Kendall; Mamrie Hart; Mitchell Davis; PJ Liguori
- Voices of: Marzia Bisognin; Carrie Fletcher; Elliott Gould; Phil Lester; Daniel Howell; Felix Kjellberg; Alfred Molina; Patrick Stewart
- Composers: Mark Binder; Martyn Axe
- Countries of origin: United States; United Kingdom
- Original language: English
- No. of seasons: 1
- No. of episodes: 6

Production
- Producers: PJ Liguori; Jamie Swarbrick; Louis Grant; Sophie Newton
- Cinematography: Mark Williams
- Editor: Patrick Nelson Barnes
- Production companies: Fixer. New Form Digital

Original release
- Release: October 16, 2014 – October 20, 2015

Oscar's Hotel for Fantastical Creatures is a British-American fantasy comedy web series created by PJ Liguori, Sophie Newton, Louis Grant and Jamie Swarbrick (working collectively under Liguori's username of KickthePJ) and directed by PJ Liguori. The series was produced by New Form Digital and was first aired digitally via Vimeo On Demand. Oscar's Hotel for Fantastical Creatures set a single-day sales record for Vimeo's On-Demand service, according to CEO Kerry Trainor. The episodes were previously available on Vimeo via paid subscription and as of November 2019, they are available on Amazon Prime.

The puppets and costumes are provided by Jim Henson's Creature Shop.

== Plot summary ==
In the British-American web series, Oscar's Hotel for Fantastical Creatures is a hotel establishment run by a man named Oscar Tangolius for a gallery of monstrous residents. When Oscar leaves on important "Cosmic Council" business for a week, he entrusts the establishment and the care of its customers to his nephew Oliver, resulting in chaos.

== Characters ==
- Oscar Tangolius (portrayed by Conor Jatter in the pilot, Andrew Ableson in the series) - The proprietor of Oscar's Hotel for Fantastical Creatures. According to Oscar, his hotel is reachable through the Forever Train, Red’s Taxi Service, and something else "equally bizarre and weird." When the series was first seen as a pilot, Oscar had a different appearance where he sported a longer beard and puffy hair.
- Oliver (portrayed by Chris Kendall) - The nephew of Oscar who works as his assistant. While Oscar was away for a week, Oliver runs the hotel in his absence. In the pilot, Oliver was a medical student who specializes in magical creatures.

=== Recurring characters ===
These characters have a major role in more than one episode.

- Octochef (portrayed by Mamrie Hart) - A pink giant octopus that works as the hotel's chef. The costume was designed by Melissa Doss and Robert Bennett, while the face makeup was provided by Nix Herrera.
- Red (portrayed by Mitchell Davis) - A red man with long horns who runs Red's Taxi Service, which brings guests to the hotel. In the pilot, Red had shorter horns.
- Mo Nay (portrayed by PJ Liguori) - A talking portrait that resides in the hotel and is friends with Oliver.

=== One-off characters ===
These characters have a major role in only one episode, although they may appear in minor or background roles in prior or subsequent episodes.

- Party Nightmare (portrayed by Jake Roper) - A disco-themed horse-headed human with a demon face within its mouth who can throw parties. Duncan Daydream was once an ordinary clown until he was transformed into the Party Nightmare upon being bitten by a pony. Anyone shot by his gun parties to the death. The costume was designed by Robert Bennett, with special animatronics provided by John Criswell.
- Wiggles the Clown (portrayed by PJ Liguori) - A clown that resides at Oscar's Hotel for Fantastical Creatures. He was the one who told Oliver about Party Nightmare.
- Murray (portrayed by Thomas Ridgewell) - A balloon security guard.
- Stan (portrayed by Bertie Gilbert) - A balloon security guard.
- Jonathan Dullhead #1 (portrayed by Joe Bereta).
- Jonathan Dullhead #2 (portrayed by Elliot Morgan).
- Rose (portrayed by Meghan Rienks) - An anthropomorphic rose.
- Crazy Wizard (portrayed by Klarity) - A wizard who is crazy.
- Maus (portrayed by Jack Howard) - An anthropomorphic mouse who works as a bellhop.
- Shark Kid (portrayed by Dean Dobbs) - An anthropomorphic hammerhead shark.
- Snow Creature (portrayed by Nix Herrera) - An unspecified humanoid Arctic creature with heads for hands that lives in the hotel's walk-in refrigerator.
- Food Creatures - A tribe of anthropomorphic foods that are found in the back of the hotel's walk-in refrigerator.
  - Ginger Root (performed by Bruce Lanoil, voiced by Carrie Fletcher) - An anthropomorphic ginger root.
  - Brock (performed by Sean Johnson, voiced by Felix Arvid Ulf Kjellberg) - An anthropomorphic clump of broccoli.
  - Carrie (performed by Carla Rudy, voiced by Marzia Bisognin) - An anthropomorphic carrot.
  - Brie (performed by Russ Walko, voiced by Daniel Howell) - An anthropomorphic brie cheese slice.
  - Rash (performed by Patrick Johnson, voiced by Phil Lester) - An anthropomorphic bacon strip.
  - Sir Loin (performed by Artie Esposito, voiced by Elliott Gould) - An anthropomorphic steak.
- Box Death (portrayed by Olan Rogers) - A bunch of boxes in a humanoid-like shape that rules the Box-World-Afterlife.
- Snow Pea (portrayed by Gabbie Hanna) - A long-nosed female from the Box-World-Afterlife.
- Seksiman (portrayed by Rob Michael Hugel) - A half-man, half-goat who lives in the Box-World-Afterlife.
- Hermit (portrayed by Grace Helbig) - An anthropomorphic hermit crab who lived in a cave that's underneath the hotel. Her costume was designed by Melissa Doss.
- Manny (portrayed by Steve Zaragoza) - An anthropomorphic mantis who works as the hotel's landscaper.
- Finn the Carp (portrayed by Emma Blackery).
- White Spirit (portrayed by Anna Akana) - A tentacled creature that destroys paintings with her paint-thinning abilities. Her costume was designed by Gypsy Taylor and her makeup was provided by Chloe Sens.
- Mo Nay Lisa (portrayed by Olga Kay) - A character with a thought bubble above her head that lives in Artlandia.
- Statue Guy (portrayed by Jarrett Sleeper) - A living statue that lives in Artlandia.
- Cubisto (portrayed by Mitchell Davis) - A cube-themed character that lives in Artlandia.
- Sonny (portrayed by Benjamin Cook).
- Queen Bee (portrayed by Hannah Hart) - An anthropomorphic queen bee who is the Queen of Busybody. Her makeup was provided by Nix Herrera.
- Norbert (voiced by Alfred Molina) - A purple anthropomorphic fish that works with Albert as a Repossession Fish for the company Magical Bill.
- Albert (performed by Kenny Stevenson, voiced by Patrick Stewart) - A green anthropomorphic fish that works with Norbert as a Repossession Fish for the company Magical Bill.
- Fly (portrayed by Toks Olagundoye) - An anthropomorphic fly.
- Bill the Worm (portrayed by Mike Falzone) - A green worm that is used in worm racing.
- Jake the Worm (portrayed by Meghan McCarthy) - A purple worm that is used in worm racing.
- Marzo (portrayed by Mary Doodles) - An insect card dealer that works in the hotel's casino.

== Episodes ==
No.	Title	Guest starring	Original release date
-	"Oscar's Hotel"	Mitchell Davis	October 16, 2014
Oliver arrives at his uncle's hotel through Red's Taxi Service where he helps his uncle Oscar deal with an Outlandish Shadow Beast that appeared in the hotel. Note: This serves as the pilot of the web series which first appeared on YouTube.
1	"The Party Nightmare"	Mamrie Hart	September 15, 2015
Oscar goes away to attend a "Cosmic Council" conference leaving his nephew Oliver in charge of the hotel while he is away for a week. In an effort to entice a more attractive clientele to the hotel, Oliver mistakenly hires Party Nightmare for a little in-lobby entertainment that unexpectedly turns the entire hotel into a nonstop rave from Hell.
2	"Hunger Pains"	Elliott Gould	September 22, 2015
Upon being informed of the lack of food by Maus and Octochef, Oliver must find food for Shark Kid. He enters the kitchen's walk-in refrigerator to find food and has an encounter with the Food Creatures.
3	"Death's Hotel"	Olan Rogers	September 29, 2015
While cleaning out the hotel's attic, Oscar accidentally slips on a banana and dies as a result of the fall. He ends up in the Box-World-Afterlife where he is unwelcomed by Box Death who bunks him with Seksiman. Now Oliver must work to let Box Death grant him a life reprieve.
4	"The Fountain of Forgetfulness"	Grace Helbig	October 6, 2015
Oliver washes up in the dank depths of the Fountain of Forgetfulness to find that he has forgotten what he was tasked with doing upon arrival. He has an encounter with the underground cave's inhabitant Hermit.
5	"Art Attack"	Anna Akana	October 13, 2015
Oliver prepares for the arrival of Queen Bee. In order to present an art to her, Oliver ends up sucked into Artlandia by Mo Nay where he encounters various art creatures like Mo Nay Lisa, Statue Guy, and Cubistro. Then he must protect them and Mo Nay from the dreaded White Spirit.
6	"Fishy Business"	Alfred Molina; Patrick Stewart	October 20, 2015
The Repossession Fish Norbert and Albert show up at Oscar's Hotel for Fantastical Creatures in order to repossess the hotel after Oliver was behind on their client's magical bill. To pay off the Repossession Fish, Oliver works with Marzo to handle a casino event in order to raise the money before the Repossession Fish return in 24 hours.

== Awards and nominations ==
In 2015, Oscar's Hotel for Fantastical Creatures was nominated at the Shorty Awards in the Best Web Series category. At the 2016 Streamy Awards, the series received four nominations and won three awards.

Year	Award	Category	Nominee	Outcome
2015	Shorty Awards	Best Web Series	Oscar's Hotel for Fantastical Creatures	Nominated
2016	Streamy Awards	Actor	Chris Kendall	Won
2016	Streamy Awards	Ensemble Cast	Oscar's Hotel for Fantastical Creatures	Nominated
2016	Streamy Awards	Costume Design	Gypsy Taylor	Won
2016	Streamy Awards	Directing	PJ Liguori	Won
2016	British Online Creator Awards	Series of the Year	Oscar's Hotel for Fantastical Creatures	Nominated
