= The Beautiful World of Jeffree Star =

Documentary web series by Shane Dawson

- Title card
- Genre: Reality; Docu-Series; Web Series; Drama
- Created by: Shane Dawson
- Directed by: Shane Dawson
- Starring: Jeffree Star; Shane Dawson; Madison Taylor; Morgan Adams; Ryland Adams; Andrew Siwicki; Nathan Schwandt
- Music by: Ryan Caraveo; Andrew Applepie; Rebecca Black
- Opening theme: "Time of the Season" by Ben Taylor Band
- Country of origin: United States
- Original language: English
- No. of seasons: 1
- No. of episodes: 8

Production
- Producer: Jessica Buttafuoco
- Cinematography: Andrew Siwicki
- Editors: Shane Dawson; Andrew Siwicki
- Camera setup: Single-camera
- Running time: 50–80 minutes

Original release
- Network: YouTube
- Release: October 1, 2019 – January 21, 2020

Related
- The Secret World of Jeffree Star

The Beautiful World of Jeffree Star is an American documentary webseries that was created by YouTuber Shane Dawson. The series follows the life of Jeffree Star, the founder and CEO of Jeffree Star Cosmetics. The series also follows Dawson and Star as they plan and design a new makeup and merchandise collection called The Conspiracy Collection. The series ran for seven episodes, premiering on October 1, 2019, and ending on November 22; an extra episode that showed bloopers and deleted scenes was released on January 21, 2020. The series, excluding the trailer, has garnered over 130 million combined views.

Production of the series began in January 2019 and continued after the airing of the second-to-last episode, "The Conspiracy Collection Reveal". The series is the second season of The Secret World of Jeffree Star and follows a similar format. The series' trailer was released on Dawson's YouTube channel on September 24 and garnered more than 10 million views in the first week of its release. The series premiered on Dawson's YouTube channel on October 1, 2019. On October 15, Dawson's online merchandise store was launched; it was sold out in under thirty minutes and accrued over half a million dollars in sales.

Reception of The Beautiful World of Jeffree Star varied throughout the series but was generally mixed. Dawson's hesitance to include a past controversy concerning James Charles and Tati Westbrook resulted in criticism; Dawson included the events in the finale of the series. Before the finale, reporters criticized the series for focusing too much on The Conspiracy Collection and compared the series' influence to that of Dawson's past works, such as The Mind of Jake Paul and The Truth about TanaCon.

The Conspiracy Collection, the main focus of the series, was highly successful after its launch on November 1, 2019; according to Star it set multiple records for the beauty industry and Jeffree Star Cosmetics. Dawson's and Star's collaborative eye shadow palette received a positive reception and the collection sold out immediately after technical issues were resolved. Some palettes were contaminated with ribbon fibers, resulting in criticism.

== Cast ==
=== Main ===
- Shane Dawson: The host and creator of the series and co-creator of the Shane Dawson x Jeffree Star collection. Dawson documents Jeffree Star's life in the beauty industry.
- Jeffree Star: The main subject of the series; CEO of Jeffree Star Cosmetics and co-creator of the collection.
- Andrew Siwicki: Dawson's friend, cameraman, and co-editor.
- Ryland Adams: Dawson's fiancé and fellow YouTuber
- Morgan Adams: Dawson's future sister-in-law and Ryland's sister.
- Madison Taylor: Star's assistant who helps him run his personal and public life, as well as manage his business.

=== Supporting ===
- Nicole Faulkner: Star's friend and makeup artist.
- Emine: A Morphe executive with whom Star and Dawson discuss an exclusive retail partnership.
- Garrett Watts: Dawson's friend and fellow YouTuber who has an intimate friendship with Star.
- Nathan Schwandt: Star's then-boyfriend.
- Colin: Star's security guard.
- Roman: Dawson's security guard.
- Coach Jess: Dawson's and Adams' fitness trainer.
- Rich Lux: A beauty guru whose song "Clock it the House" is used in the fourth episode.

== Episodes ==
No.	Title	Directed by	Original release date
1	"The Beautiful World of Jeffree Star"	Shane Dawson and Andrew Siwicki	October 1, 2019
On February 26, 2019, Dawson goes to a Morphe Cosmetics store opening in Sacramento, California. Dawson documents the security that Star hires for his public appearances, the crowd at the store opening, and the private car and plane that Star arranges for the trip. There are minor discussions about The Conspiracy Collection.
2	"The Secrets of the Beauty World"	Shane Dawson and Andrew Siwicki	October 4, 2019
Star and Dawson attend their first board meeting on February 28, 2019; they discuss preliminary colors, prices, percentages, production, and potential sales of their palette and liquid lipstick collection. Star and Dawson also discuss NikkieTutorials' collaboration with Too Faced Cosmetics.
3	"The Dangerous World of Jeffree Star"	Shane Dawson and Andrew Siwicki	October 11, 2019
Dawson and Star review the first test shades, and decide whether to make a second, smaller palette along with a pig-shaped mirror. Product valued at $1,000,000 is stolen from Jeffree Star Cosmetics. Dawson navigates his way through a controversy for which he came under scrutiny for a 2015 joke about him making a sexual advance towards his cat. Dawson proposes to Adams in front of his family.
4	"The $20 Million Dollar Deal with Jeffree Star"	Shane Dawson and Andrew Siwicki	October 18, 2019
Dawson and Adams visit their old home, from which they moved in 2018. Dawson and Star talk with Emine, a Morphe executive, about an exclusive sales partnership. Dawson and Star visit a lab the day before the launch of the Blue Blood palette, viewing its production line and also reviewing the revised shades of Dawson's palette.
5	"The Ugly Side of the Beauty World"	Shane Dawson and Andrew Siwicki	October 28, 2019
Dawson is shown designs for his palettes; he rejects the designs he is shown while the deadline grows nearer. As Dawson and Siwicki discuss ideas, Anna, the design manager, sends them an image idea for the box; Dawson and Siwicki like the idea and immediately design a prototype.
6	"The Conspiracy Collection Reveal – Jeffree Star x Shane Dawson"	Shane Dawson and Andrew Siwicki	October 29, 2019
Dawson and Star reveal their Conspiracy palette. Dawson and Star talk about the photograph session and plans for the launch and a video. They also have a meeting with Star's team to plan the number of units they will need for the launch and discuss the shipping process. Star talks about the death of his dog Diamond and the declining health his other Pomeranian Daddy. Dawson and Star reminisce about the last few months and share an intimate moment after Dawson starts to cry happy tears in Star's factory while overseeing the manufacture of the palettes.
7	"The Beautiful World of Shane Dawson"	Shane Dawson and Andrew Siwicki	November 22, 2019
Dawson and Star show their reactions to Westbrook's and Charles' controversy alongside videos showing viewers asking Dawson to show the clips. The Conspiracy Collection is launched and almost immediately, most online retailers crash. Dawson, Star, and Star's team call Shopify to get their website back online. The call is cut short due to a Morphe store launch at the Mall of America. A new shade will be added to the Mini Controversy palette in the March and May 2020 restocks.
8	"The End of the Beauty World"	Shane Dawson and Andrew Siwicki	January 21, 2020
This episode features deleted scenes and bloopers that were cut from the first seven episodes. Scenes included a security scare at Dawson's house, discussions about PR packages, and others. The episode was uploaded onto Dawson's second channel, "ShaneGlossin".

== Background ==
Jeffree Star, the owner of Jeffree Star Cosmetics, is the main focus of Dawson's first documentary series, The Secret World of Jeffree Star, during which Dawson and Star discuss ideas for a collaboration. Star announced The Beautiful World of Jeffree Star in December 2018, saying the series is one "that's never been done before". Star also owns Killer Merch, a clothing manufacturing company. The merchandise store sells hoodies, phone cases, pig-shaped backpacks, hats, joggers, sandals, and t-shirts.

In the second episode, "The Secrets of the Beauty World", Star and Dawson discuss the shares of the collection's profits that Star, Dawson, and other contributors would be receiving. During the episode, Star comments about NikkieTutorials' collaboration with Estée Lauder's Too Faced Cosmetics. Anonymous sources claimed Nikkie only made $40,000 from the collaboration that made a profit of at least $8,000,000. According to Nikkie, she was "naive" for signing the contract with Too Faced. About two weeks after the publication of the sixth episode, Dawson commented about the production of the second episode, stating, "Sorry it's taken a while but we just needed some time to figure out how to end it right and give u guys everything we promised".

In 2019, James Charles was involved in a controversy with Tati Westbrook about her "BYE SISTER..." video that accused James Charles of predatory behavior and sexual harassment of a straight man. Charles responded with a video called "tati" and later "No More Lies", which explained how the situation occurred and refuted many of Westbrook's claims. The "No More Lies" video said Jeffree Star harassed and threatened Charles through iMessage, and Charles' brother through Twitter. Star deleted his tweets and apologized, and Charles lost three million subscribers in May 2019.

Dawson provided more information about the finale using Instagram's live streaming feature, expressing concern about the footage containing reactions to Charles' quarrel and doubt he would be able to include the footage in the finale. He stated there was no new information about the quarrel and that publishing the footage would hinder people from moving on from it. Dawson stated the series was originally going to have nine parts, with three episodes dedicated to the quarrel, which he regretted including in the series' trailer. After constant complaints from fans, however, Dawson eventually covered Charles' and Westbrook's falling out.

== Production ==
The trailer for the series was released on September 24, 2019; it includes footage of Dawson and Star and of Dawson reacting to Charles' controversy with Tati Westbrook. Some viewers expressed concern about the inclusion of Charles' controversy in the series. The trailer did not include additional information about the series and received a positive reception.

Before the sixth episode "The Conspiracy Collection Reveal" premiered, Star announced filming by Siwicki was still occurring. Star also said of the launch week, "[t]his week will be one of the most insane weeks of our lives". Star stated that filming of the series began in January 2019.

Music is a major part of the series so Dawson created a Spotify playlist that included all of the songs used during the series. Notable artists such as Catie Turner, Hoodie Allen, and Ricky Montgomery had multiple songs featured throughout the series. "Time of the Season" by The Ben Taylor Band served as the theme song of the series.

On January 7, 2020, Dawson announced the planned to make a final episode of the series that featured bloopers and deleted scenes from the first seven episodes. On January 21, 2020, Dawson released the extra episode on his secondary makeup channel, "ShaneGlossin". This episode includes footage of an attempted break-in of Dawson's house. The scene also includes the arrival of police and the intruder's arrest.

== The Conspiracy Collection ==
After the publication of most of the episodes of The Beautiful World of Jeffree Star, its viewers anticipated the launch of The Conspiracy Collection. According to Star in the fourth episode of the series, Dawson could have earned $10,000,000 from the deal. The collection consists of liquid lipsticks, mirrors, an eye shadow palette, lip gloss, makeup bags and lip balm. Prices of The Conspiracy Collection ranged from US$28 to $90. Soon after its launch, all of the products sold out. A partial restock occurred on November 8, 2019, and all other products were restocked on Black Friday.

On November 1, 2019, at 10 a.m. PST, Morphe stores, online makeup stores and retailers, and Star's website started selling The Conspiracy Collection. Almost immediately, Shopify, the company that hosts Star's website, crashed due to high levels of traffic. Morphe and other smaller beauty sites sold out within fifteen minutes. An hour after the launch, there were still two and a half million people waiting in the queue for Star's website. Initial reactions to the launch were mixed; at stores, some stated that they had difficulty, while others were successful in getting the collection—however, most reacted negatively to the website crashing. Some stores claimed to have sold out of products before the official launch. A few hours after the launch, Star's website was back online and customers could complete their purchases. Within three hours the collection had sold out.

During the launch of The Conspiracy Collection, the hashtag "#ShaneDawsonxJeffreeStar" started trending on Twitter and became the most-trending topic for several hours. Other hashtags and mentions, such as "#ConspiracyPallete", "#ConspiracyCollection", and "Morphe", also began trending but never reached number one. A pre-order for the restocked collection contained 60,000 "Mini Controversy" and "Conspiracy" eye shadow palettes, and the pre-order also sold out. Star said the entire collection would be restocked in early 2020.

On November 10, 2019, Star released a video announcing the collection had broken several records. Six days after the collection's launch, over one million eye shadow palettes had been sold. Star also said the launch was the biggest e-commerce launch in the history of the internet.

During the finale of the series, Star said The Conspiracy Collection set a record for most Morphe sales and that the Mini Controversy palette would change for the March and May 2020 restocks. An untitled green shade shown in the series was replaced with other shades. After fans pleaded on social media for the shade to be replaced, Dawson and Star relented, substituting "Cry On My Couch" with the new shade, titled "Put it Back!". Star also discussed a packaging revamp for the Mini Controversy palette. However, due to the COVID-19 pandemic, the restocks were delayed until June 20, 2020.

=== Ribbon fibers issue ===
After the launch of The Conspiracy Collection, some customers who bought the palette complained on social media it contained tiny hairs or fibers. An investigation found the foreign inclusions came from "the cut ribbon sheets that were pressed into the product". Star stated the company would no longer use scissor-cut ribbon and that they would start using a black light to identify fibers. He and his team "have sent out new palettes and [have] also given a full refund" to everyone who received a bad palette. Star stated on his Instagram Stories only thirty-five of the more-than-one million palettes produced were affected by this mistake, which had been resolved.

== Reception ==
Number of viewers per episode

The Beautiful World of Jeffree Star had a mixed reception from fans, which varied during the course of the series' publication. The eponymous first episode of the series was relatively uncontroversial; fans praised it for "feeling like a movie" and including Star's and Dawson's discussions about personal insecurities.

Commentators criticized the first six episodes; most fans thought that the series should focus less on The Conspiracy Collection and more on the arguments shown in the trailer for the series. Alex Casey and Jihee Junn, writing for The Spinoff, criticized the series for focusing too much on Jeffree Star Cosmetics rather than the makeup industry as a whole, and also criticized the series' cinematography for being disorienting. They considered it "the smartest advertising campaign of the influencer age" and praised the series for covering the business of the makeup world in detail. Casey added, "I have never seen anything that better untangles, re-tangles and then sets on fire the ... rat king of money, power, influence and eyeshadow at this particular point in time in the hell world, whether they are doing it consciously or not".

Initially, critics considered the series to be an advertisement for The Conspiracy Collection and reporters had mixed reactions to it. In an article about Star, Scaachi Koul of BuzzFeed News stated the producers "used [the series] as an opportunity to promote a new 'Conspiracy Collection' makeup collaboration to their vast combined audience". Koul hailed the collection for being "a resounding, almost preposterous success". Koul mentioned a Killer Merch collection with Dawson that also sold and said the collection would have been successful without The Beautiful World of Jeffree Star.

Brittney Rigby, writing for the Australian news website Mumbrella, considered the advertisement-like nature of the series to be positive. Rigby praised Dawson and Star for The Conspiracy Collection, and considered the advertisements for the collection and the series itself to be "an overwhelming success". Rigby states; "The series is a story, but also a very long ad for Jeffree Star Cosmetics and Dawson's own make-up collection and merch. Yet it doesn't feel like an ad at all." She said the fanbase of Star and Dawson is one that "brands can only dream of".

Julia Alexander, writing for The Verge, initially perceived the series to be one that follows Star's personal issues and makeup line, and one that discusses the Westbrook-Charles spat. She also noted there was wide anticipation for the new series as there had been for The Mind of Jake Paul, The Return of Eugenia Cooney, and The Truth about TanaCon; Alexander stated the reason for such anticipation was that Dawson provides "insider access" into the documentaries. In a later review, Alexander discussed The Conspiracy Collection and James Charles' collaboration with Morphe Cosmetics. She noted the criticism of Charles' palette and compared the palette's price ranges and revenue, and notes that "regardless of who wins this season's palette battle ... Morphe gets a slice". Alexander also commented on the changed nature of the series: "Dawson's documentary was supposed to be about Star, ... but it turned into a six-hour-long sales pitch for their new palette". She also noted some viewers thought Dawson was "hopping on a popular YouTube trend to make a quick buck" but she considered the series to be "structured to fight" those thoughts. Virginia Glaze of Dexerto said the exclusion of the Westbrook-Charles squabble was "for the better".

Zooey Norman, writing for Screen Rant, considers it the seventh-best series created by Dawson for venturing into the "business aspect of the makeup world"; Norman considers Conspiracy Series with Shane Dawson to be his best. The first episode was highlighted in YouTube Rewind 2019: For the Record as the second-most liked beauty video behind Charles' "Makeup Tutorial en Español". Most episodes of The Beautiful World of Jeffree Star reached the number-one spot on YouTube's trending page when published.
