= Killer Merch =

American merchandising company

Killer Merch LLC is an American merchandising company co-owned by beauty YouTuber Jeffree Star. It also manages ecommerce, design, production and fulfillment.

== History ==
Killer Merch was founded in 2014 by unnamed "music industry professionals" and was originally meant for music artists, but expanded to work with internet celebrities in 2016. It currently works with around forty of them.

Killer Merch appeared in The Beautiful World of Jeffree Star. In 2019, Killer Merch and its business development manager Stefan Toler partnered with Cody Ko and Noel Miller to sell their merchandise. The company previously represented their music group Tiny Meat Gang and sold their tour merchandise after partnering with them a year ago. Killer Merch also works with mainstream celebrities such as Kevin Hart and Lil Dicky.

In October 2019, Killer Merch and Shane Dawson partnered to launch Dawson's merchandise. The items sold out within an hour. After his feud with Tati Westbrook, Killer Merch discontinued its partnership with James Charles' clothing line Sisters Apparel. Despite both Star's and Dawson's involvement with the controversy, Killer Merch continued to restock Dawson's merchandise to backlash online.

In 2020, Killer Merch partnered with Ninja and Fortnite (2017). Star also opened Killer Merch's sister company Scorpio Logistics, for anonymous clients and managing Star's Star Lounge brand, in Casper, Wyoming.

== Facility ==
Killer Merch operates from a five-warehouse facility in Chatsworth, Los Angeles. The facility also houses Jeffree Star Cosmetics and had 125 employees. In March 2020, Star closed Killer Merch's offices, but they have since been reopened. They received a COVID-19 relief loan in September 2020, and ten confirmed cases of COVID-19 were reported the next month.
