= Tea channel =

Social media phenomenon

Tea accounts, known on YouTube as drama channels or tea channels, are social media accounts that report on internet controversy and drama ("tea"). They exist on YouTube, Twitter and Instagram. On YouTube, tea channels include Spill and Tea by Ali. Drama YouTubers include DramaAlert and The Shade Room. Similarly, commentary YouTubers such as Danny Gonzalez, Drew Gooden and D'Angelo Wallace also report on online controversy. Tea accounts are also on TikTok.

Commentary has existed on YouTube since its early days. The anonymous channel YT Watchdog was active from 2006 to 2015 and, under a voice filter, called out other YouTuber for actions such as artificially inflating video rankings using alternate accounts. Various drama channels, commentary channels and tea channels now exist on YouTube. While many tea channels are anonymous and focus mainly on the evidence, drama and commentary channels often have a central figure who viewers watch for their personality and opinions. In 2018, several tea channels became popular for their coverage of "Dramageddon", a feud between five Beauty YouTubers. Tea accounts were actively involved in the controversy between beauty YouTubers James Charles and Tati Westbrook, who released statements to YouTubers rather than media outlets. Taylor Lorenz of The Atlantic described tea accounts as "online gossip magazines on steroids".

== Commercial success ==
Tea accounts on YouTube earn revenue from Google AdSense. Many have supplemented their income from brand sponsorships, affiliate programs, and third party memberships. Companies have also created tea channels most notability the channel Spill which was created by the Canadian media company AWED.

== Controversy ==
Tea accounts have been heavily criticized on the internet and media for encouraging gossip and fueling influencer feuds and scandals much like how tabloids do so with mainstream celebrities. One of the biggest internet feuds in history between beauty vloggers James Charles and Tati Westbrook was infamously blown out of proportion due to tea channels painstakingly documenting every incremental update on the feud and shared them live. While this feud was covered by mainstream media outlets such as CNN, both Tati and James released their statements to tea channels on YouTube such as Here For The Tea.

Many tea accounts on YouTube have been accused of copyright infringement due to using content from other creators to commentate on. While fair use laws permit the use of copyrighted material for the purpose of research, education, criticism, review or news reporting, many YouTube creators have been known to issue copyright strikes against tea channels that have reported negatively on them.

== See also ==
- Tabloid
- Internet celebrity
