= D'Angelo Wallace =

American YouTube commentator (born 1998)

- Born: August 29, 1998 (age 28); Virginia Beach, Virginia, U.S.
- Occupation: YouTuber

YouTube information
- Channels: D'Angelo Wallace; dangelowallace; D’Angelo
- Genre: Commentary
- Subscribers: 1.98 million (dangelowallace); 1.68 million (D'Angelo Wallace); 712 thousand (d-angelo.); 47.9 thousand (Office Husband)
- Views: 80.5 million (dangelowallace); 137.3 million (D'Angelo Wallace); 80.9 million (d-angelo.); 347 thousand (Office Husband)
- Last updated: January 2, 2026

D'Angelo Wallace (born August 29, 1998) is an American commentary YouTuber, known for his videos of controversial YouTubers and Internet personalities.

His commentary style has been compared to other YouTube commentators such as Danny Gonzalez, Drew Gooden, and Kurtis Conner, although his content has often balanced or combined trivia associated with YouTube commentary channels with more hard-hitting topics. He has been described by Vulture as a "receipt-keeper of YouTube" and praised him for taking down the worst people on the online platform.

== YouTube career ==
=== Main channel ===
Wallace's original channel (mainly talking about art and related topics) began in 2018 and gained 100,000 subscribers in a year. As of 2020, Social Blade estimated that Wallace could earn more than $300,000 per year from his two channels. In October 2020 and July 2023, Wallace was nominated for a YouTube Streamy Award.

=== Second channel ===
Wallace started a second channel in 2020 to talk about non-art-related subjects. On this channel, which has since grown larger than the first, Wallace provides social commentary on YouTubers and influencers, as well as pop culture and general entertainment. One of his notable earlier videos included a discussion over the YouTube channel "Spill", a channel discussing YouTube drama, and as to whether it was run by an individual or a corporation. The channel later stated that it was run by a corporation.

=== Dramageddon ===
In July 2020, Wallace was described by Insider as "one of the loudest voices holding Internet personalities Jeffree Star and Shane Dawson accountable for their past behavior", (Note: Jeffree Star and Shane Dawson faced criticism online for racist content they had posted in the past. Criticism of the two increased during protests related to the Black Lives Matter movement. Dawson had also been criticized for his past comments on child sexual abuse, the sexualisation of minors, and bestiality.) and produced a three video series – first on Star, then Dawson – deconstructing the role each played in the controversy between two beauty gurus, James Charles and Tati Westbrook. The final video in the series explores the role Westbrook played in the situation from her initial Bye Sister video from 2019, and the follow-up Breaking My Silence in 2020. Wallace's criticism of Dawson and Star's role in the controversy, known as Dramageddon, was praised for its extensive documentation of facts and evidence, and shaped "how millions of YouTube fans now view the three beauty gurus and their drama".

Following his video on Dawson (the second video in the series), Wallace's subscriber count went from 630,000 to 1 million. As of March 2021, his subscriber count across his two channels was 3.28 million. By April 2021, Wallace was in the process of removing the videos from his channel since, due to new disclosures, including misconduct accusations against Charles from the month prior, he does not consider them to paint a clear and complete picture anymore.

=== Cuties ===
His first video to be featured on YouTube's "Trending" tab, named Cuties: The film that got Netflix blasted by the government and posted on September 13, 2020, was a critique of Cuties, a film that he said encouraged child exploitation. The film had been the subject of a broader culture wars controversy in the United States.

=== Influencer-19 ===
Wallace has been critical of the action of some social media influencers during the COVID-19 pandemic, with his video Influencer-19, published on February 1, 2021, being highly critical of those who broke public health and safety restrictions enacted as part of national responses to the COVID-19 pandemic.

== Personal life ==
Wallace has described his gender identity as "a non-binary man" who uses he/him personal pronouns. He has also come out as aromantic asexual.

He received a degree from Our Lady of the Lake University in 2018, and is based in North Carolina.

== Awards and nominations ==
Ceremony	Year	Category	Result	Ref.
Streamy Awards	2020	Best Commentary	Nominated	
Streamy Awards	2023	Best Commentary	Nominated	
