= Cupcakes Taste Like Violence =

EP by Jeffree Star
- Released: December 9, 2008
- Recorded: 2007–2008
- Genre: Electropop, electroclash
- Length: 22:28
- Label: Popsicle
- Producer: Ultraviolet Sound; Smile Future; Chris Qualls; Sami Diament

Jeffree Star chronology
Plastic Surgery Slumber Party (2007)	Cupcakes Taste Like Violence (2008)	Beauty Killer (2009)

Singles from Cupcakes Taste Like Violence
- 1. "Lollipop Luxury" Released: November 18, 2008

Cupcakes Taste Like Violence is the second EP by American singer, songwriter, make-up artist and model Jeffree Star. It was released on December 9, 2008, and was the first record to be released under Popsicle Records through Warner Music's Independent Label Group. The first single, "Lollipop Luxury", was released on November 18, 2008.

== Background ==
After announcing in 2007 that recording was underway for his first studio album, Beauty Killer, Star embarked on his first headlining tour. While on tour, he performed songs written for inclusion on the record, including "Cupcakes Taste Like Violence" and a cover of Rockwell's "Somebody's Watching Me". Star stated in interviews that the latter track featured Trace Cyrus and Mason Musso from Metro Station. However, due to a feud between the band and Star, they were ultimately replaced with Andrew de Torres from Danger Radio.

During the tour, Star announced the names of several songs which would be included on Beauty Killer, including "Picture Perfect!" and "So Fierce". However, these songs did not make the final cut but a remixed version of "Lollipop Luxury" featuring Nicki Minaj is featured on the album. The following summer, Star debuted "So Fierce" on the Vans Warped Tour.

The EP was announced with the title Cupcakes Taste Like Violence. Of the title, Star said "I named my EP Cupcakes Taste Like Violence because it reminded me of myself. I may look sweet, but I'm really scary and violent on the inside."

=== Working titles ===
- The track "Cupcakes Taste Like Violence" had the working title of "Cupcakes & Violence (Which One are You Choosing?)".
- The track "Picture Perfect!" had the working title of "Mascara + Mistakes = Murder".

== Release and promotion ==
With Beauty Killer scheduled for release in late 2008, his cover of "Somebody's Watching Me" was chosen as the album's first single. However, the album's release date was pushed back to summer 2009. Star then began promoting the release of an EP on his MySpace profile, with "Starstruck", a retitling of his recording of "Somebody's Watching Me", as the EP's first single.

To promote the EP, Star announced that "Starstruck" would be released as a free download on MySpace on October 3, 2008. However, the song was made available as early as September 28 on his Pure Volume profile.

The song "Cupcakes Taste Like Violence" was featured on the popular MTV TV show Paris Hilton's My New BFF.

=== Artwork design ===
The album cover and booklet photos were taken by Kat Von D with some booklet photos being taken by photographer and filmmaker, Austin Young.

== Track listing ==
No.	Title	Writer(s)	Producer(s)	Length
1.	"Miss Boombox"	Jeffree Star; Sarah Hudson; Sami Diament	Ultraviolet Sound	4:14
2.	"Lollipop Luxury"	Star; Nico Hartikainen	Smile Future	4:07
3.	"Cupcakes Taste Like Violence"	Star; Chris Qualls; Ryan Seaman	Qualls	3:18
4.	"Picture Perfect!"	Star; Hartikainen	Smile Future	4:06
5.	"So Fierce"	Star; Qualls	Qualls	3:24
6.	"Heart Surgery" (UVEV Remix)	Star; Qualls	Qualls; Diament	3:19

== Personnel ==
- Jeffree Star – vocals

Additional musicians

- Lauren Baird – additional vocals on "Cupcakes Taste Like Violence", "So Fierce" and "Heart Surgery" (UVEV Remix)
- Jordan Blake – additional vocals on "So Fierce"
- Sarah Hudson – additional vocals on "Miss Boombox"

== Charts ==
Chart (2008)	Peak position
US Billboard Top Heatseekers	8
US Billboard Top Dance/Electronic Albums	6

== Release history ==
Region	Date	Label	Format
United States	December 9, 2008	Popsicle	CD, digital download
United Kingdom	December 18, 2008	Popsicle	CD, digital download
