= The Secret World of Jeffree Star =

Documentary web series by Shane Dawson

- Genre: Reality television; Documentary series; Web series
- Created by: Shane Dawson
- Directed by: Shane Dawson
- Starring: Shane Dawson; Jeffree Star; Andrew Siwicki; Nathan Schwandt; Ryland Adams; Garrett Watts; James Charles
- Opening theme: "Beauty Killer" by Jeffree Star
- No. of seasons: 1
- No. of episodes: 5

Production
- Producers: Shane Dawson; Andrew Siwicki; Trisha Paytas
- Production location: Los Angeles, California
- Cinematography: Andrew Siwicki
- Editors: Shane Dawson; Andrew Siwicki
- Running time: 30-42 minutes

Original release
- Network: YouTube
- Release: August 1 – August 9, 2018

Related
- The Beautiful World of Jeffree Star

The Secret World of Jeffree Star is an American web series created by YouTuber Shane Dawson. The web series was announced on July 24, 2018, through Dawson's Twitter. Its premiere debuted August 1, 2018 on Dawson's YouTube channel. The series is presented by Dawson and stars himself and makeup entrepreneur and Internet personality Jeffree Star. Appearances by James Charles, Ryland Adams and Garrett Watts are also featured, with Dawson's film and editing collaborator Andrew Siwicki as camera operator for the duration of the series. The documentary focuses on the life of Jeffree Star, particularly his beginnings as a musician before leaving the industry to focus on his YouTube career and makeup brand.

== Cast ==
=== Main ===
- Shane Dawson: The host and creator of the series who visits Jeffree Star to document him.
- Jeffree Star: He is the subject of the series that focuses on his life, both present and past.
- Nathan Schwandt: Star's then-boyfriend.
- Garrett Watts: He is Dawson's friend and a fellow YouTuber who strikes up a close and intimate friendship with Star.
- Ryland Adams: Dawson's husband (then boyfriend) and a fellow YouTuber
- Andrew Siwicki: He is Dawson's friend and the cameraman who serves as a secondary host of the series.
- James Charles: A YouTuber make-up artist who prepares and transforms Dawson via makeup to resemble Star; as Dawson tries to live a day in Star's shoes.

== Episodes ==
No.	Title	Directed by	Original release date
1	"The Secret World of Jeffree Star"	Shane Dawson	August 1, 2018
Fascinated by his success, Shane Dawson investigates the mysterious life of Jeffree Star. Shane arrives at his home in Calabasas and explores the mansion, showing the luxurious life Jeffree has obtained from his career.
2	"Becoming Jeffree Star for a Day"	Shane Dawson	August 2, 2018
Shane gets a Jeffree Star makeover by James Charles and gets to know a little more about Jeffree through an interview process. Jeffree also reminisces about his past music career and talks about why he acted and looked the way he did back in the MySpace days.
3	"Switching Lives with Jeffree Star"	Shane Dawson	August 3, 2018
Shane and Jeffree go to the Jeffree Star Cosmetics warehouse and learn about the inner workings of Jeffree Star Cosmetics. They also talk about more little secrets that nobody knows about. Jeffree also talks about the amount of money it cost to run his business. Shane tries to figure out how Jeffree has all of his money.
4	"The Secret Life of Jeffree Star"	Shane Dawson	August 8, 2018
Jeffree visits Shane and showcase the differences between their lives. They are also joined by Ryland Adams and Garrett Watts as they travel to the factory which produces Star's own line of cosmetics.
5	"The Truth About Jeffree Star"	Shane Dawson	August 9, 2018
The finale concludes with Shane surprising Jeffree with a visit to his original apartment in which he lived for 8 years. Jeffree shares a candid story about the dark times of his past. Shane finally understands who Jeffree Star is.
