= I've Been Here Before =

I've Been Here Before may refer to:

- "I've Been Here Before", a song by Ernie Haase & Signature Sound
- "I've Been Here Before", a song by Nural from the album Entitlement
- "I've Been Here Before", a song by Sara Groves from the album Floodplain
- "Déjà Vu (I've Been Here Before)", a song by Teena Marie from the album Wild and Peaceful
