= Catie Turner =

American singer (born 2000)

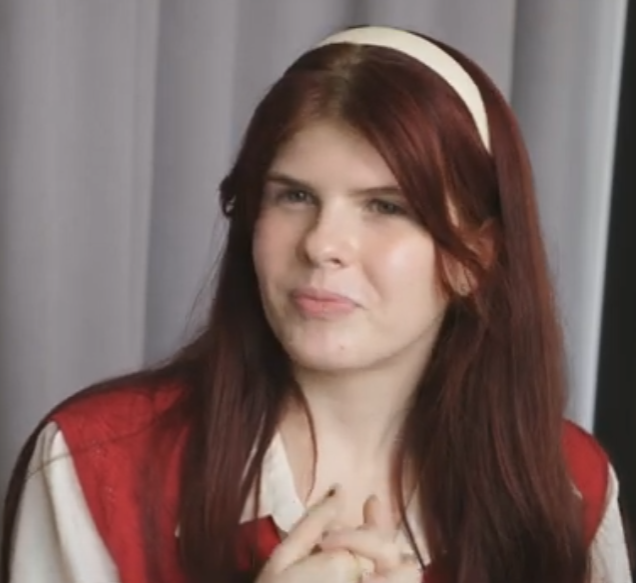
- In a 2023 interview

Background information
- Born: Catie Virginia Turner; February 14, 2000 (age 26); Bucks County, Pennsylvania, U.S.
- Genres: Pop; indie pop
- Occupations: Singer; songwriter
- Years active: 2018–present
- Label: Atlantic Records
- Website: catieturner.com

Catie Virginia Turner (born February 14, 2000) is an American pop singer. She rose to prominence as a contestant on sixteenth season of American Idol, placing in the top seven. In September 2019, Turner further gained notoriety after her song "Prom Queen" was used in the trailer for Shane Dawson's web series The Beautiful World of Jeffree Star, which gained over 11 million views in just one week. She has released four EPs: The Sad Vegan as an independent artist, followed by Heartbroken and Milking It, Comedy & Tragedy: Act I, and Comedy & Tragedy: Act II with Atlantic Records.

== Career ==
=== 2017–2018: American Idol ===
Turner had previously auditioned for several reality singing shows, beginning at 11 years old with America's Got Talent. She then auditioned for The Voice twice and auditioned unsuccessfully for the fifteenth season of American Idol. After trying again in 2017, she received a golden ticket to Hollywood. In an audition held in New York, she sang her original song "21st Century Machine." Her segment on American Idol was the first shown during the sixteenth season's premiere on March 11, 2018.

After getting through Hollywood Week, she made it to the Showcase Round where she sang "Bad Romance" by Lady Gaga. In the Top 24, she sang "Call Me" by Blondie and "Good to Be Alive (Hallelujah)" with Andy Grammer. After advancing to the Top 14, she sang "Take Me to Church" by Hozier and immediately advanced to the next round. In the Top 10, she sang "Once Upon a Dream" from the movie Sleeping Beauty.

She advanced to the Top 7, where she was one of two contestants to be eliminated from American Idol. After singing "Oops!... I Did It Again" by Britney Spears, Turner forgot some of the words to "Manic Monday" by The Bangles, a flub noticed by the judges. After her elimination, Turner commented that if she had been voted into the next episode, she would have given up her spot to another contestant. Clay Aiken, who finished second place on the second season of American Idol, called the show a "Vacation Bible School talent show" for the judges' response to the blunder.

During the sixteenth season finale, she reprised her original "21st Century Machine" and sang "Part of Me" as a duet with Katy Perry. Turner was among the performers starring in American Idol Live! 2018, a 47-city tour that ran from July 11 through September 16, 2018.

==== Performance results ====
Episode	Theme	Song Choice	Original Artist	Order Number	Result
Audition	Auditioner's Choice	"21st Century Machine"	Herself	N/A	Advanced
Hollywood Round, Part 1	Contestant's Choice	"Come Together"	The Beatles	N/A	Advanced
Hollywood Round, Part 2	Group Performance	"La La La" (with Alyssa Raghu, Kyah Robinson and Victoria McQueen)	Naughty Boy	N/A	Advanced
Hollywood Round, Part 3	Contestant's Choice	"Pity"	Herself	N/A	Advanced
Showcase Round/Top 50	Contestant's Choice	"Bad Romance"	Lady Gaga	10	Advanced
Top 24 Solo/Duet	Contestant's Choice	Solo "Call Me"	Blondie	3	Advanced
Top 24 Solo/Duet	Contestant's Choice	Duet "Good to Be Alive (Hallelujah)" (with Andy Grammer)	Andy Grammer	1	Advanced
Top 14	Contestant's Choice	"Take Me to Church"	Hozier	7	Safe
Top 14	Victory Song	"Havana"	Camila Cabello	13	Safe
Top 10	Disney	"Once Upon a Dream" (from Sleeping Beauty)	Jack Lawrence & Sammy Fain	9	Safe
Top 7	Year of Birth	"Oops!... I Did It Again"	Britney Spears	5	Eliminated
Top 7	Prince	"Manic Monday"	The Bangles	12	Eliminated

Non-competition performances:
Episode	Collaborator(s)	Song	Original Artist
Top 10	Katy Perry and Top 10	"When You Wish Upon a Star"	Leigh Harline & Ned Washington
Finale	N/A	"21st Century Machine"	Herself
Finale	Katy Perry	"Part of Me"	Katy Perry

=== 2019: The Sad Vegan ===
She performed in Los Angeles in 2018 with Haley Reinhart at the Troubadour and performed solo at the El Rey Theatre and Hotel Cafe. In the spring of 2019, she performed as an opening act for singer Justin Jesso in Los Angeles, New York and Toronto, followed by an opening spot for Meghan Trainor in Atlantic City.

On March 1, 2019, Turner released "Prom Queen". Raisa Bruner of Time described the song as displaying "aching, existential honesty", with Turner's voice suggesting "wisdom beyond her years". Madeline Crone of American Songwriter described it as an "anxiety-ridden underdog anthem". On June 7, 2019, she released "Savior," her lead single for her debut EP, The Sad Vegan, which released June 14. In the summer of 2019, she headlined The Sad Vegan Tour.

On May 17, 2019, Turner, partnering with Postmodern Jukebox, made a vintage strings cover of Billie Eilish's song "idontwannabeyouanymore." The cover has over 1.4 million views on YouTube as of December 2021.

On September 24, 2019, her live and acoustic version of "Prom Queen" was used in its entirety as the trailer for Shane Dawson's 2019 YouTube series The Beautiful World of Jeffree Star. The trailer was #1 trending on YouTube, receiving more than 11 million views in one week. The series has also featured several songs from her EP, The Sad Vegan, including "Breathe," "Home," and "Party!"

=== 2020–2022: Record deal, Heartbroken and Milking It ===
On April 29, 2020, Turner signed to Atlantic Records over a Zoom call. In November of that year, she made her Atlantic Records debut with the single "One Day".

On July 16, 2021, Turner released her second EP, Heartbroken and Milking It, with six songs written during the COVID-19 pandemic. In an interview with American Songwriter, Turner explained the title: "When you have nothing to write about during a pandemic, what can you do? You can milk from past heartbreak." The EP included two previous singles: "Play God" and "Therapy".

Another single, "(Wish I Didn't Have to) Lie" featuring the pop artist Jordy, was distributed after the EP's release. The song brought the pair on the cover of Spotify's "Sad Hour" playlist. Turner would later sing "(Wish I Didn't Have to) Lie" for Jordy's Mind Games Tour in December 2021. She was also, along with pop artist Oston, an opening act on the tour.

Turner released the song "God Must Hate Me" on November 23, 2021, after a demo that she teased on her TikTok account went viral.

"Fat Funny Friend," composed by Turner with American Idol sixteenth season contestant Maddie Zahm, became Zahm's breakthrough single after her recording of the song was released on February 4, 2022.

=== 2023–present: Comedy & Tragedy ===
On June 9, 2023, Turner released her third EP, Comedy & Tragedy: Act I, featuring her previous single, "God Must Hate Me," and five other tracks. In June 2023, she embarked on a 15-city tour, her first as a headliner, in support of the EP. A second volume, Comedy & Tragedy: Act II, was released on October 27, 2023.

== Personal life ==
In 2018, Turner graduated from Neshaminy High School in Langhorne, Pennsylvania.

In July 2022, her father died.

In 2023, Turner released a song titled "Comedy & Tragedy" honoring her late father. In her song “Hometown,” Turner alludes to feelings about her father’s illness and his death from cancer, reflecting on this personal tragedy in her lyrics.

== Discography ==
=== Extended plays ===
List of studio albums, with selected details
Title	Details
The Sad Vegan	Released: June 14, 2019; Label: Independent; Format: CD, digital download, streaming
Heartbroken and Milking It	Released: July 16, 2021; Label: Atlantic Records; Format: CD, digital download, streaming
Comedy & Tragedy: Act I	Released: June 9, 2023; Label: Atlantic Records; Format: digital download, streaming
Comedy & Tragedy: Act II	Released: October 27, 2023; Label: Atlantic Records; Format: digital download, streaming
Grow out of You	Released: October 10, 2025; Format: digital download, streaming

=== Singles ===
List of singles as lead artist, with selected chart positions and certifications, showing year released and album name
Title	Year	Album/EP
"21st Century Machine"	2018	Non-album singles
"Prom Queen"	2019	The Sad Vegan
"Savior"	2019	The Sad Vegan
"Breathe"	2019	The Sad Vegan
"Home"	2019	The Sad Vegan
"Gets Better"	2019	Non-album singles
"I Luv Him."	2019	Non-album singles
"One Day"	2020	Non-album singles
"Play God"	2021	Heartbroken and Milking It
"Hide and Seek"	2021	Non-album singles
"Mama"	2021	Non-album singles
"Hide and Seek (Le Youth Remix)"	2021	Non-album singles
"Therapy"	2021	Heartbroken and Milking It
"(Wish I Didn't Have to) Lie" (featuring Jordy)	2021	Heartbroken and Milking It
"God Must Hate Me"	2021	Comedy & Tragedy: Act I
"Nothing"	2022	Non-album singles
"Step Mom"	2022	Non-album singles
"Hyperfixations"	2023	Comedy & Tragedy: Act I
"Easy"	2023	Comedy & Tragedy: Act I
"Hometown"	2023	Comedy & Tragedy: Act I
"Friends"	2024	Non-album singles
"Comedown"	2024	Non-album singles
"Last Name"	2024	Non-album singles
"I Might"	2025	Growing out of You
"Not Young, Just Dumb"	2025	Growing out of You
"Tourist Attraction"	2025	Growing out of You
"Shrinking Violet"	2025	Non-album singles
