= Drift: The Sideways Craze =

- Directed by: Smadar Hanson
- Starring: Samuel Hubinette; Ken Gushi; Tyson Beckford; Alex Corstorphine
- Theme music composer: Nural; Miles On End
- Country of origin: United States
- Original language: English

Production
- Producers: Sabra Productions, LLC; Smadar Hanson; Clyde Berg
- Editor: Andrew Landini
- Running time: 60 minutes

Original release
- Network: Discovery HD
- Release: February 13, 2007

Drift: The Sideways Craze is a 2007 documentary television film about professional drifting. It features drifting champion Samuel Hubinette and upcoming star Ken Gushi preparing for the D1 Grand Prix, while teaching an amateur the basics of drifting. The film was aired for four years by Discovery HD and is included as bonus content in Fast and The Furious Blu-ray Box Set.
