= Brittani Louise Taylor =

American author, actress & YouTube personality (born 1983)

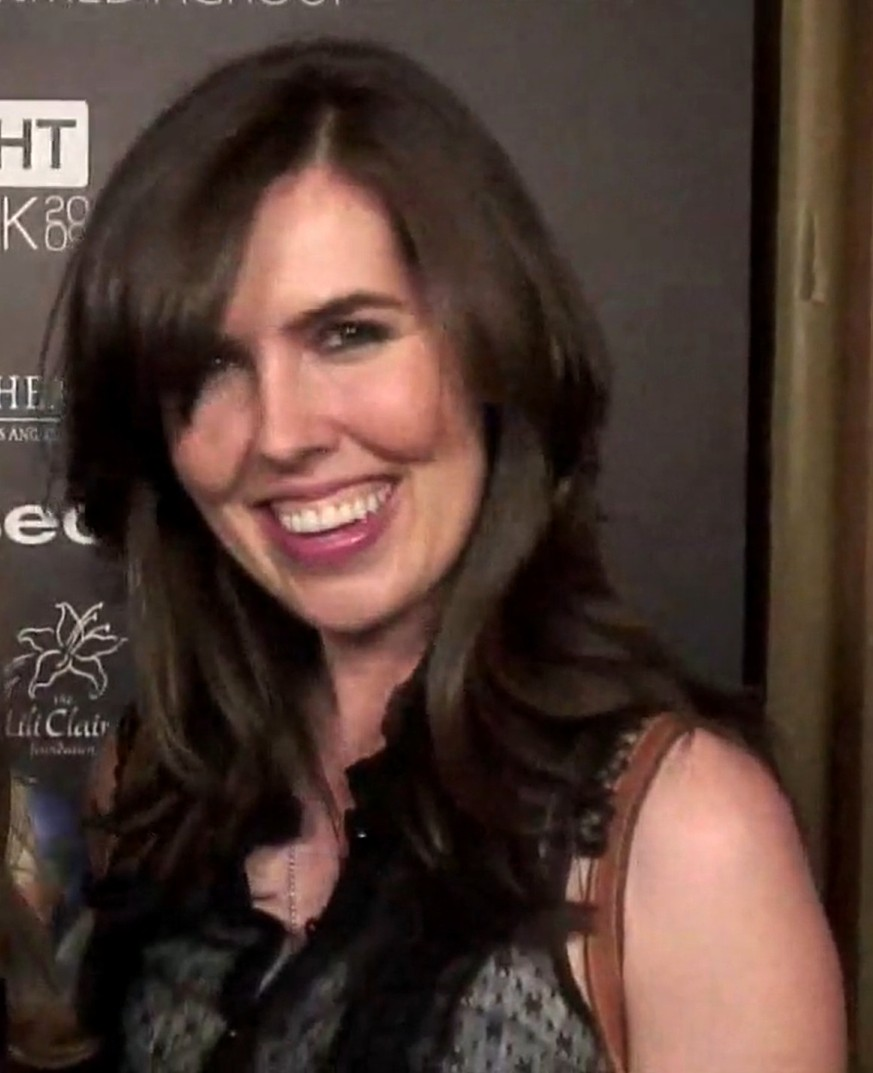
- Taylor in 2009
- Born: August 24, 1983 (age 43); Minnesota, U.S.
- Education: Arizona State University (dropped out)
- Occupations: YouTuber; author; actress
- Known for: A Sucky Love Story: Overcoming Unhappily Ever After

YouTube information
- Channel: Brittani Louise Taylor
- Years active: 2007–present
- Subscribers: 1.41 million
- Views: 267 million
- Last updated: May 12, 2025

Brittani Louise Taylor (born August 24, 1983) is an American author, actress and YouTube personality. She rose to prominence through her YouTube channel, where she creates a variety of content ranging from music video parodies to personal vlogs.

== Early life and education ==
Taylor was born in Minnesota before moving to Arizona with her family. She graduated from Sedona Red Rock High School. According to Taylor, she attended Arizona State University but dropped out to attempt a career in acting in Los Angeles. Her interest in entertainment and media led her to pursue a career in digital content creation.

== Career ==
Taylor launched her YouTube channel in 2007, shortly after YouTube introduced its revenue-sharing Partner Program. She quickly gained a substantial following, amassing over 1.3 million subscribers and 267 million video views by 2024. Taylor's channel features a mix of lifestyle content, personal stories, and insights into her life as a mother.

=== A Sucky Love Story & Shane Dawson appearance (2018–2019) ===
In 2018, Taylor released a memoir titled A Sucky Love Story: Overcoming Unhappily Ever After, which was published by Post Hill Press and distributed by Simon & Schuster. In the book, Taylor discusses meeting the man who was to become the father of her child who, unbeknownst to her, was a sociopath whose intentions were covertly sinister. She details in the book the domestic abuse, psychological torment and close call with human trafficking that she endured at the hands of her partner. In 2019, Taylor publicly spoke on these experiences in a highly-viewed episode of Shane Dawson's conspiracy series on YouTube. Taylor and Dawson have been close friends since the late 2000s, having both started their YouTube channels at the same time and been featured in a significant amount of each others early content on the platform. Her story, featured in her writing, on television and in Dawson's web series, brought significant attention to the issues of domestic violence and online safety. Taylor's openness about her struggles with PTSD following these events has been a critical part of her narrative on her channel.

=== Saintsville (2020) ===
In 2020, Taylor published her first fiction novel titled Saintsville which, like Taylor’s A Sucky Love Story, is distributed by Simon & Schuster.

== Personal life ==
Taylor and her ex-boyfriend, Milo, have a son named Misha, more commonly referred to as 'Rex', who was born in 2016.

== Filmography ==
Year	Title	Role	Type	Country	Refs
2010	Last Moments of Relationships	Brittani	Web series	United States	
2013	BlackBoxTV Presents	Amy	Web series	United States	
2013	Shadow People	Vlogger	Feature film	United States	
2013	Evil Twins	Mrs. Jones	TV series	United States	
2014	Henchmen	Lisa	TV mini-series	United States	
2014	Rubberhead	Bride	TV movie	United States	
2015	Bob Thunder: Internet Assassin	Herself	Feature film	United States	
2019	Conspiracy Series with Shane Dawson	Herself	Web series	United States	

== Bibliography ==
Year	Title	Target/Type	Distributor	Refs
2018	A Sucky Love Story: Overcoming Unhappily Ever After	Memoir	Simon & Schuster	
2020	Saintsville	Fiction	Simon & Schuster	
