= Lollipop Luxury =

2008 single by Jeffree Star

Single by Jeffree Star

from the album Cupcakes Taste Like Violence & Beauty Killer
- Released: November 18, 2008
- Recorded: 2008
- Genre: Electropop
- Length: 4:07
- Label: Popsicle
- Songwriters: Jeffree Star, Nico Hartikainen
- Producer: Smile Future

Jeffree Star singles chronology
"I Hate Music" (2008)	"Lollipop Luxury" (2008)	"Prisoner" (2010)

"Lollipop Luxury" is a song by American recording artist and songwriter Jeffree Star. It is the only single from the album Cupcakes Taste Like Violence. The song was written by Jeffree Star and Nico Hartikainen in 2008 and it was produced by Smile Future. "Lollipop Luxury" was released on November 18, 2008, as Star's first official single.

== Background and release ==
Star announced in 2007 that he was going to be recording his first studio album, Beauty Killer. It was planned to be released in summer of 2008, but was pushed back to fall of 2009. During this time period, Star recorded "Lollipop Luxury" through his own record label, Popsicle Records. The song was written by Jeffree Star and Nico Hartikainen and produced by Smile Future.

Star released the song on November 18, 2008, and it came out on Cupcakes Taste Like Violence on December 9, 2008. After the release, Star teamed up with Nicki Minaj to write the remix of "Lollipop Luxury." Star then released the song on his Myspace page not knowing that it would one day be on his studio album. Beauty Killer came out on September 22, 2009, with the song featuring Minaj. Due to Star not releasing a song in 2011, "Lollipop Luxury" featuring Minaj came out as a single on iTunes on June 16, 2011.

== Critical reception ==
Paper's Justin Moran noted the track's "glittery synths and unruly arrogance" and melody that sounds like a "bitchy lullaby", saying it "ambitiously united all of Star's obsessions — candy, wealth, sex, self-obsession, and celebrity — inside a dance-pop single blatantly designed to shock". Moran also called it a "climax in the musical style Star had been carving out for himself online".

== Nicki Minaj remix ==
"Lollipop Luxury"

Single by Jeffree Star featuring Nicki Minaj

from the album Beauty Killer
- Released: June 16, 2011
- Recorded: 2008
- Genre: Dance-pop
- Length: 3:35
- Label: Popsicle
- Songwriters: Jeffree Star; Nico Hartikainen; Onika Maraj
- Producer: Smile Future

Jeffree Star singles chronology
"I'm in Love (With a Killer)" (2010)	"Lollipop Luxury" (2011)	"Prom Night!" (2012)

Nicki Minaj singles chronology
"Where Them Girls At" (2011)	"Lollipop Luxury" (2011)	"Fly" (2011)

A remixed version of the song, featuring Nicki Minaj, was released on the album Beauty Killer on September 22, 2009, and came out as a single on June 16, 2011. The track was later recognized as one of the earliest tracks to feature Minaj, originally being released prior to her first solo single.

== Track listing ==
Digital download

1. Lollipop Luxury – 4:07

Lollipop Luxury (feat. Nicki Minaj) – Single

1. Lollipop Luxury" (featuring Nicki Minaj) – 3:35

== Personnel ==
Original

- Jeffree Star – vocals

Remix

- Jeffree Star – vocals
- Nicki Minaj – additional vocals
