= Beauty Killer =

- original cover art

Studio album by Jeffree Star
- Released: September 21, 2009
- Recorded: 2007 – June 2009
- Genres: Electropop; synth-pop; electronic rock; dance-pop; crunkcore; electronica
- Length: 41:40
- Label: Popsicle
- Producers: Nathaniel Motte; Lester Mendez; Gods Paparazzi; Oh; Hush!; Smile Future; Oligee; FUTRLVRS; Simon Wilcox; Tommy Coops; Heather Peggs

Jeffree Star chronology
Cupcakes Taste Like Violence (2008)	Beauty Killer (2009)	Mr. Diva (2012)

Singles from Beauty Killer
- 1. "Prisoner" Released: April 29, 2009; 2. "Get Away with Murder" Released: February 3, 2010; 3. "Beauty Killer" Released: June 20, 2010; 4. "Lollipop Luxury" Released: June 16, 2011

Beauty Killer is the first and only studio album by American singer Jeffree Star, released on September 21, 2009, under Popsicle Records with distribution from Independent Label Group. The album was mainly produced by God's Paparazzi, and features work from other producers and artists, including producer Lester Mendez and Young Money singer and rapper Nicki Minaj. Beauty Killer features rock, electronic, dance, and pop elements in its music and lyrics, similar to previous works from Star. The album debuted at number 122 on the Billboard 200 chart.

The album spawned two official singles, "Prisoner" and "Lollipop Luxury", and several promotional singles, including "Love Rhymes with Fuck You", "Blush" and "Beauty Killer". Music videos were made for both "Get Away with Murder" and "Beauty Killer", and were made available for streaming and digital download in 2009 and 2010, respectively.

In September 2024, Star announced a 15th anniversary edition of the album with a re-release on CD, vinyl and digital formats. The album received a new cover and three new songs, "Hi, How Are Ya?", "Red Lipstick (feat. Yelawolf)" and "Beauty Killer (Wyoming Edition)".

== Background ==
It was announced that recording was underway for Jeffree Star's first studio album in late 2007. He stated that the new songs "are more sexy, some are more 'guy'ish and some are me screaming my heart out. I'm still finding what "Jeffree Star" really is. And I think I'm almost there..." Star also said that with this album he "embraced a lot of rock elements, mixed it with dance and kind of made something really unique that no one's ever heard before", also saying "I've just never really made music that I guess I've been 100 percent proud of, you know? It was time for me to take myself more seriously. It's like my big, 'How are you?' to the world." The album is produced by Lester Mendez, 3OH!3's Nathaniel Motte, Luke Walker (commonly known as his alias God's Paparazzi), Simon Wilcox and Oh, Hush!. Other producers for the album include Tommy Coops, Heather Peggs and Smile Future. Star wanted the album to "show that [he] had real musical talent" as his previous works were "just thrown together really quickly and there wasn't much effort put into it [them]."

Recording for the album was done in the span of nearly a year. The tracks "Get Away with Murder", "Prisoner" and "Louis Vuitton Body Bag" were recorded at Mad Dog Studios in Burbank, California. Star also recorded the album's title song, "Beauty Killer", at UVS Labs in Los Angeles, California. While in Silverlake, California, Star recorded the songs "Love Rhymes with Fuck You", "Fame & Riches, Rehab Bitches" and "Queen of the Club Scene" at Pulse Recording. While there, Star also recorded part of the track "Electric Sugar Pop". The recording for that song was finished in Chicago, Illinois. Star also stopped in Santa Monica, California. While there, he recorded multiple songs for the album, including "Bitch, Please!", "Get Physical" and "Fresh Meat", which were recorded at EMI Publishing Studios. "Lollipop Luxury" was recorded at The Tree Fort and Sound City in Los Angeles, California and Hot Beats in Atlanta, Georgia. "Lollipop Luxury" was originally released in 2008, as the lead promotional single from Star's second extended play, Cupcakes Taste Like Violence, and went on to become one of his signature songs amongst fans. For Beauty Killer, Young Money rapper Nicki Minaj appears on a new version of the song. Although the composition remains mostly unchanged, the beginning of the song states "Jeffree Star and Nicki Minaj", where as the original version did not state Star's name. After the second chorus, Minaj has a rap verse, which includes references to songs such as "Milkshake" by Kelis. Matt Skiba, who had gained notability as the lead singer and guitarist for punk rock band Alkaline Trio, provides guest vocals for the song "Louis Vuitton Body Bag", which is named after the French fashion house Louis Vuitton, which gained popularity mainly for its purses and bags. Electronic rock duo Breathe Carolina provide vocals on the track "Fame & Riches, Rehab Bitches".

== Composition ==
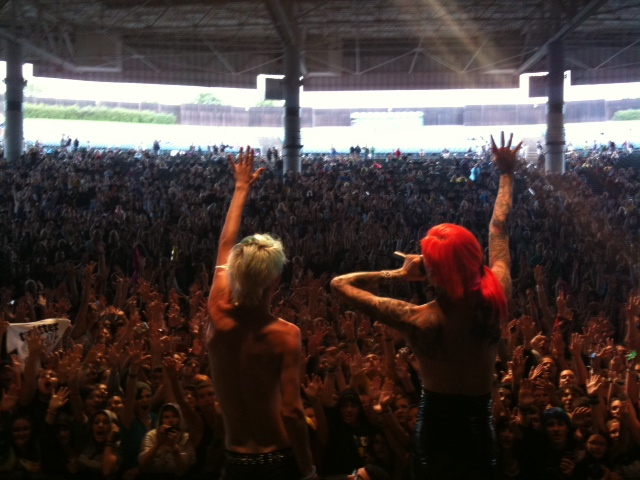
Star performing at Warped Tour 2009

The music found on Beauty Killer is mainly dance-pop music. Elements of rock and punk music can be found on the album as well. During an interview, Star said of the album's music, "I think in the beginning I was just kinda like joking around and just making shit up – y'know, for fun. I wasn't taking anything really seriously. So for Beauty Killer, I'd toured for two years and worked with a lot of different people. I knew what I wanted to sound like and I had way more production and spent more time on the lyrics too." When speaking of the album's composition, Star commented "Every song has a different feel to it. There are tracks with heavy guitars and some of them are more fun Britney Spears dance-club type stuff. There's definitely some club anthems mixed in there." He has also stated "It's my first proper album and I had the chance to explore myself as an artist more than my previous works and got to work with some amazing producers. Musically and lyrically it's different then what I've released in the past... it's the perfect CD for anyone who's lost and needs to find their diamond tiara."

"Get Away with Murder" is a song which deals with Star breaking up with someone. The lyrics contain lines such as "I'm gonna break your heart, and get away with murder." The song features elements of rock music, as well as pop and electronic music. Jess Grenier of shrednews called the song "clever", and praised its lyrical content. A music video was filmed for the song, and released in 2010. "Prisoner", the album's lead single, features Star singing about stalking someone and being in love with them. In "Prisoner", Star sings "...lock me up, throw away the key/don't care if I'm in trouble deep/I'm addicted to your love." "Louis Vuitton Body Bag" was described by Wildy Haskel of the Wildy's World website as being "the best dance track" on Beauty Killer, though called the lyrics "dark.", with several lines making references to suicide. "Beauty Killer" is the album's title track, and features elements of electronic music, as well as rock music and pop music. The song has received positive feedback, mainly for its meaning and lyrical content, in which Star claims he wishes to change people's opinions as to what beauty really is. "Electric Sugar Pop" has been described as a "bubblegum pop" song, while receiving praise for its lighthearted and fun nature. "Love Rhymes With Fuck You" was released as the album's first promotional single, and second total after "Prisoner". The electronic song features explicit lyrics from Star, and sexual moans in the background in various places. Star also incorporates screamo elements in the song.

"Bitch, Please!" features elements of electronic music, and makes several cultural references throughout the song, including "Bottle Pop" by female group The Pussycat Dolls, as well as pop singer Britney Spears and the hit single "Don't Trust Me" by 3OH!3. It has been listed as a highlight of the album by various reviewers and fans. "Lollipop Luxury", which features female rapper Nicki Minaj on guest vocals, is a remixed version of a previously released song by Star. This new version features a rap verse from Minaj, and removes the original third verse of the song. "Get Physical" is a dance song which features Star singing about having sex with someone. The song received mixed to positive reception. "Fame & Riches, Rehab Bitches" features electronic duo Breathe Carolina on guest vocals, and features elements of punk music, as well as screamo and hard rock music. "Fresh Meat" and "Queen of the Club Scene" received mixed reviews from critics, with the majority feeling the two didn't belong on the album. The two were described as "filler tracks", though did receive somewhat positive reviews.

The album features several references to Chuck Palahniuk's Invisible Monsters, one of Star's favorite novels. For example, in the song "Louis Vuitton Body Bag", he sings: "To be ourselves, we have to destroy ourselves" referring to Shannon McFarland's decision to shoot herself to escape her old life. In the song "Beauty Killer", the line "Doll eyes stare into Valium colored skies" refers to Brandy Alexander's addiction to Valium and beauty. In the song, "Fame & Riches, Rehab Bitches" he refers to Brandy Alexander's nickname "Queen Supreme"; Star also named one of his liquid lipsticks "Queen Supreme".

== Release and promotion ==
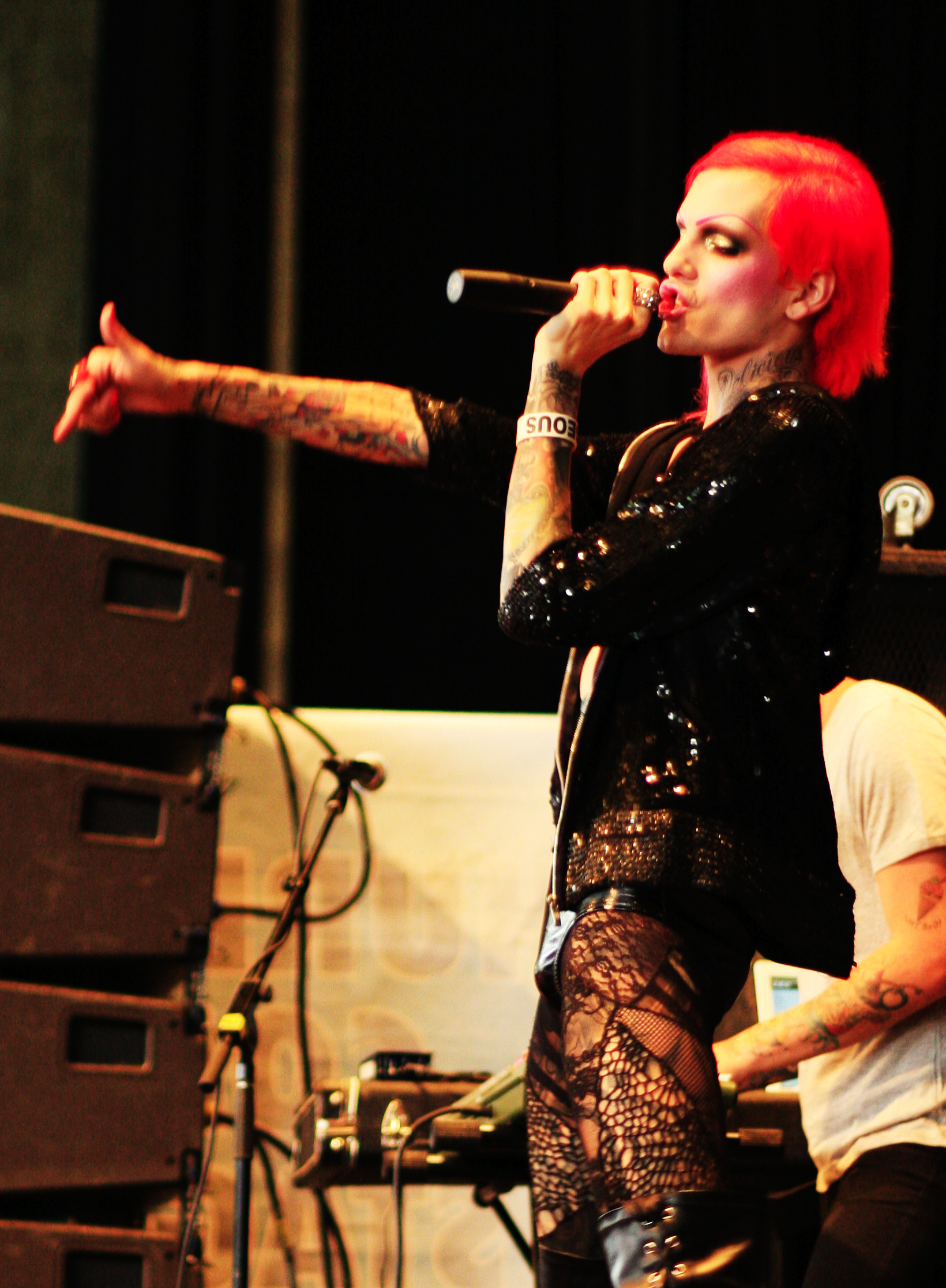
Star at the Vans Warped Tour in 2009

The first announcement of Beauty Killer mentioned a scheduled release in spring 2008. However, the album's release date was later pushed back to summer 2009, which in the meantime Star released his second extended play Cupcakes Taste Like Violence. In an interview with OrangeCounty.com regarding the release date of the album, Star explained that the repetitive postponing was due to him doing "a bit of community service because of a felony weapons charge". To promote the new album and "tide fans over" until the first single from the album was released, on April 21, 2009, Star released a remix cover of The Black Eyed Peas' "Boom Boom Pow" which was made available for free download. "Bitch, Please!" was also made available for stream on Star's Myspace page in late August. This was shortly followed by "Fame & Riches, Rehab Bitches" making its stream debut on Star's PureVolume account in September. The next day, Star posted "Louis Vuitton Body Bag" onto his YouTube account. The entire album was available for streaming on his Myspace homepage on September 19, 2009. The album was released as both a physical disk and for digital download on September 22, 2009 in the United States. It was released for digital download on October 2 in areas such as the United Kingdom, Australia, and Asia.

Star performed at Warped Tour 2009 followed by the America leg of his "I'm Pregnant, Let's Party" tour for the rest of the summer. Shortly after the album was released, Star announced a two-week winter "I'm Cold, Keep Me Warm... Bitch!" tour in North America. However, due to "personal things [that] have gotten out of hand in [his] family" the tour was cancelled. Star embarked on his "2 Drunk 2 Fuck" 2010 world tour, in which he stated he would "be going everywhere...and yes that means Europe and Australia". It was his first headlining tour to promote Beauty Killer. It featured Brokencyde and Blood On the Dancefloor as the opening acts for various North American dates, while BrokeNCYDE was a co-headlining act for the European legs. He also headlined the "Lookin' Hot and Dangerous" tour throughout 2010, which featured mainly North American shows, though four were outside of the US. Throughout late 2010 and early 2011, Star toured with pop-singer Dev on his Fresh Meat tour, named after the song from the album. The tour only featured North American dates, going through the United States, Canada, and Mexico. A music video for "Prisoner" was originally planned in September 2009, though it was later replaced with "Get Away with Murder", which was filmed on November 7, 2009. The video premiered on the front page of Myspace on January 23, 2010. A music video for the title track, "Beauty Killer", was filmed in May 2010. The video premiered on Star's YouTube channel on June 19, 2010.

=== Singles ===
Beauty Killer spawned two official singles and several promotional singles. The first promotional single for the album was a remix of the hit single "Boom Boom Pow" by the Black Eyed Peas, which he released on April 21, 2009. The remix of the number one single did not appear on Beauty Killer. "Prisoner" was the album's first official single, and was released on April 29, 2009. The single features pop rock elements, and lyrically sees Star singing about how he is obsessed with being with someone. A music video was planned for the single, but was later scrapped in favor of recording the music video for "Get Away with Murder". The second promotional single, "Love Rhymes with Fuck You", was released on June 30, 2009. After the release of the album, Star announced plans to film a music video for the song "Get Away with Murder". The video was released on YouTube and for digital download, though the song never received an official release. The album's title track, "Beauty Killer", received similar treatment in 2010. Following the album's commercial success, Star released the song "Blush", an outtake from the original track listing. The song was released for digital download on February 16, 2010. A sixth promotional single, "Size of Your Boat", featured Muffy and was released for digital download on June 29, 2010. "Lollipop Luxury" was later released as the album's second official single on June 16, 2011.

=== Title and artwork ===
Beauty Killer is, in Star's own words, "my way of saying 'fuck you' to what everyone's idea of what beauty stands for." The album cover photo was taken by tattoo artist and now ex-friend, Kat Von D. It features Star with his hair in a ponytail pulled to the side. His arms are held up, as if surrendering, and his hands are covered in blood. Star is topless in the image, and has a white glove on his right hand. Kat Von D also took the photos in the album booklet, excluding two taken by Austin Young. The layout and design was created by Sons of Nero. The photos found in the booklet are similar to the album cover itself. One photo shows Star curled into a ball, in the same attire as the cover, while another picture shows an apparently shocked Star with his hands on his head and his mouth wide open. There are also photos of Star in nothing but a pair of pink underwear, slashing a chainsaw around. Multiple colors are strewn on several photos in the booklet, giving it the appearance of paint being thrown onto the picture.

== Critical reception ==
Professional ratings
Review scores
Source	Rating
AllMusic	3/5 stars
OutImpact.com	favorable
Plug in Music	C
PopMatters	7/10 stars
Shut Up! Magazine	3.5/5 stars

The album received generally mixed to positive reviews from critics. Pemberton Roach of AllMusic praised the album, saying it is "a fun, no-frills dance-pop record filled with throbbing house beats, Auto-Tuned vocals, and super-catchy, sexually charged novelty lyrics." Roach went on to say "Throughout, his lyrics employ all manner of slang of the day to both celebrate and lampoon the basest sectors of pop culture. In the end, though, Star is clearly all-inclusive, making Beauty Killer a harmlessly naughty guilty pleasure." Michael Heath of PopMatters stated "His vocals convey the required melodrama, smut, and wit, especially wit. Star's awareness of the absurdity of Hollywood culture vulturism grounds the lyrics of "Lollipop Luxury" and "Fame & Riches, Rehab Bitches", a collaboration with shouty electro-thrashers Breathe Carolina (Matt Skiba of Alkaline Trio also guests). One does wish most of Star's musical backdrops didn't sound like the worst aspects of pounding goth-industrial warhorses or the sort of Red Bull and bad Ecstasy club soundtrack Star's lyrics willingly satirize. Fortunately, there's enough moments here, like the G. Glitter microchip stomp of "Electric Sugar Pop", to provide welcome relief." Luis Gonzales of Album Confessions also gave a positive review, finding Beauty Killer "a dark, twisted pop album that comes together to represent an artist that many may not relate to right away. The artist and the music are something completely different and I think that is where it works. The album is filled with great tracks that will not hit every audience, but for those who are looking for something new, this is truly a hidden gem." He later listed "Louis Vuitton Body Bag", "Bitch, Please!", and "Queen of the Club Scene" as must-hear tracks.

Corinne of PlugIn Music gave the album a mixed review, saying "Star shows on Beauty Killer that he has the musical chops to make a half-decent album. And he does just that. But when he plays too much to the audience, the celebrity, the fame, the character it turns sour. Having a point of view is one thing but it doesn't hold water if it's too embellished. Sure, his electronics aren't terribly original but if there's one thing that Jeffree Star doesn't sound like it is recycled." Wonka Vision said "...if Beauty Killer is the best Star can muster for a debut album then perhaps he should consider sticking with the clothing lines and makeup for the time being."

== Chart performance ==
Beauty Killer was released on September 22, 2009, and became Star's first album to chart on the Billboard 200, where it peaked at number 122. It also peaked at number 22 on the Independent Albums chart in the US, and fell off in its second week. On the Top Dance/Electronic Albums chart, the album debuted at number 7. It fell to 12 in its second week, and stayed on the chart for two more weeks after that, before falling off the chart. The album debuted and peaked at number 2 on the Top Heatseekers chart, where it charted for two consecutive weeks. Beauty Killer became Star's second album to chart on both the Independent Albums and the Heatseeker Albums charts, after his 2008 extended play Cupcakes Taste Like Violence.

== Track listing ==
Beauty Killer – Standard edition
No.	Title	Writer(s)	Producer(s)	Length
1.	"Get Away with Murder"	Jeffree Star, Luke Walker, Ollie Goldstein	God's Paparazzi	3:42
2.	"Prisoner"	Star, Walker	God's Paparazzi, Oligee	3:50
3.	"Louis Vuitton Body Bag" (featuring Matt Skiba)	Star, Walker	God's Paparazzi	3:14
4.	"Beauty Killer"	Star, Sami Diament, Sarah Hudson	FUTRLVRS	3:45
5.	"Electric Sugar Pop"	Star, Oh, Hush!	Oh, Hush!, God's Paparazzi	3:17
6.	"Love Rhymes with Fuck You"	Star, Walker, Robert Amaru III, Amanda Amaru	God's Paparazzi	4:01
7.	"Bitch, Please!"	Star, Nathaniel Motte, Simon Wilcox	Nathaniel Motte, Simon Wilcox	3:16
8.	"Lollipop Luxury" (featuring Nicki Minaj)	Star, Nico Hartikainen, Nicki Minaj	Smile Future	3:37
9.	"Get Physical"	Star, Lester Mendez, Simon Wilcox	Lester Mendez	3:08
10.	"Fame & Riches, Rehab Bitches" (featuring Breathe Carolina)	Star, Tommy Coops, Andrew Pour	Tommy Coops, God's Paparazzi, Heather Peggs	3:08
11.	"Fresh Meat"	Star, Nathaniel Motte, Wilcox	Nathaniel Motte, Simon Wilcox	2:56
12.	"Queen of the Club Scene"	Star, P. Meese	God's Paparazzi	3:46

Bonus track version
No.	Title	Writer(s)	Producer(s)	Length
13.	"Gorgeous"	Star, Mendez, Wilcox	Lester Mendez	2:42
14.	"Party Crusher"	Star, Walker	God's Paparazzi	3:46
15.	"God Hates Your Outfit"	Star, Nathaniel Motte, Wilcox	Nathaniel Motte, Simon Wilcox	3:14

== Personnel ==
- Jeffree Star – vocals

Additional musicians

- Breathe Carolina – additional vocals on "Fame & Riches, Rehab Bitches"
- Kyle Castellani – additional vocals on "Fresh Meat"
- Sarah Hudson – additional vocals on "Beauty Killer"
- Nicki Minaj – guest vocals on "Lollipop Luxury"
- Oh, Hush! – additional vocals on "Electric Sugar Pop"
- Matt Skiba – guest vocals on "Louis Vuitton Body Bag"
- Simon Wilcox – additional vocals on "Bitch, Please!", "Get Physical" and "Fresh Meat"
- Porcelain Black- Duet with Jeffree Star on remake of "Prisoner"

== Charts ==
Chart (2009)	Peak position
US Billboard 200	122
US Billboard Top Dance/Electronic Albums	7
US Billboard Independent Albums	22

== Release history ==
Region	Date	Label	Format
United States	September 22, 2009	Popsicle	CD, digital download
United Kingdom	October 2, 2009	Popsicle	Digital download
Australia	October 2, 2009	Popsicle	Digital download
Asia	October 2, 2009	Popsicle	Digital download
