= The Mind of Jake Paul =

Documentary web series by Shane Dawson

- Title card
- Genre: Web series
- Created by: Shane Dawson
- Developed by: Shane Dawson
- Starring: Shane Dawson; Jake Paul; Alissa Violet; Erika Costell; Nick Crompton; Andrew Siwicki; Kati Morton
- No. of seasons: 1
- No. of episodes: 8

Production
- Executive producer: Shane Dawson
- Producer: Jessica Buttafuoco
- Production locations: Los Angeles, California
- Editors: Shane Dawson; Andrew Siwicki
- Camera setup: Single-camera
- Running time: 38-105 minutes

Original release
- Network: YouTube
- Release: September 25 – October 18, 2018

Related
- The Secret World of Jeffree Star; Conspiracy Series with Shane Dawson

The Mind of Jake Paul is an American documentary web series created by YouTuber Shane Dawson. The series is presented by Dawson, who investigates the world and mind of controversial fellow YouTuber Jake Paul as well as the general psychology of YouTubers. Dawson does this with Kati Morton, another popular YouTuber who is a licensed marriage and family therapist. The series was promoted through Dawson's Twitter and is stylistically similar to Dawson's previous web series, The Secret World of Jeffree Star. It premiered on September 25, 2018, and concluded after eight episodes on October 18, 2018.

The Mind of Jake Paul generally received mixed reviews, with the second episode of the series, "The Dark Side of Jake Paul," being sharply criticized for its outdated use of the term "sociopath." Professional critics reviewing the series noted its lack of true insight on Paul and the fact that neither Dawson nor Morton are subject matter experts in mental health. Ultimately, the series was successful, garnering a combined total of over 175 million views. Conspiracy Series with Shane Dawson—Dawson's following project—was released in this same formatting similarity.

== Background ==
Before production of The Mind of Jake Paul started, Dawson thought about making a video "...about the idea that YouTubers have to have some kind of personality disorder." The project started with a series of tweets from Paul and Dawson wherein they agreed they would collaborate. Dawson also told Paul the purpose of the series was to investigate if he was a sociopath, before the trailer was published. The web series was announced on September 11, 2018, through Dawson's Twitter account. The announcement was controversial due to Paul's past controversies on YouTube and elsewhere—Dawson brought him back into the spotlight. It follows Dawson's previous series, The Secret World of Jeffree Star, and is similar in format.

== Synopsis ==
The first four episodes in The Mind of Jake Paul are referred to as the "research phase" by Dawson. In the first episode, "The Mind of Jake Paul," Dawson states that the purpose of The Mind of Jake Paul is to investigate Jake Paul's psychology. Dawson investigates multiple allegations related to Jake Paul's behavior. Namely, Dawson discusses, with fellow YouTuber iNabber, allegations of fake relationships in Paul's videos and assault allegations related to Paul's former relationship with Alissa Violet. In the second episode, Dawson interviews therapist Kati Morton and discusses Jake Paul's psychology; notably, he investigates if Jake Paul is a sociopath. As an introduction to the video, one of Jake Paul's vlogs are shown, showing him doing a "buried alive prank" with Team 10 member Tessa Brooks. Morton compares sociopaths to narcissists, and states "they have no empathy." In the third video, Dawson addresses controversy surrounding the previous video and discusses Logan Paul's response to the first two videos. The third video also discusses Jake Paul's family and criticism of his parents. Concluding the "research phase" in the fourth video, Dawson interviews Nick Crompton, a former member of Team 10. Crompton states the group still had the purpose of functioning as a business. Dawson discusses Alissa Violet's relationship with both Jake Paul and Logan Paul in the fourth episode, and Crompton also states that all pranks presented in Team 10 videos are fake.

Jake Paul first makes an appearance in "The World of Jake Paul". Kati Morton enters the Team 10 house disguised as a producer. Paul and his former girlfriend, Erika Costell, are interviewed by Dawson. Dawson compares himself to Jake Paul—they especially relate when comparing their childhoods. Morton says she "feels bad" for Paul while also stating she was suspicious about Paul. The penultimate video goes into further detail about Alissa Violet, Jake Paul, and Logan Paul. Violet confirms allegations that she had a relationship with Logan Paul. However, she also states her public relationship with Jake Paul was fake. She also called Jake Paul an "emotional abuser." The series finale of The Mind of Jake Paul discusses Jake's thoughts about his videos and his personal life.

== Cast ==
- Shane Dawson: The host and creator of the series. He visits Jake Paul and documents his life: present and past.
- Jake Paul: He is the subject of the series, where his past and present are talked about.
- Alissa Violet: Paul's ex-girlfriend and former Team 10 member.
- Erika Costell: Paul's former girlfriend, then COO and member of Team 10.
- Kati Morton: A licensed marriage and family therapist who analyzes Paul in an attempt to determine if he is a sociopath.
- Nick Crompton: A former friend of Paul and former COO of Team 10.
- Andrew Siwicki: The co-director, co-editor, and cameraman of the series.
- Fraser Macdonald (iNabber): A fellow YouTuber that provides Dawson with general information on Jake Paul's online life.
- Daniel "Keemstar" Keem: An online news reporter of drama and controversies surrounding other YouTube personalities.
- Ryland Adams: Dawson's husband (then boyfriend).
- Morgan Adams: Ryland's sister and a former fan of the Paul Brothers.

== Episodes ==
No.	Title	Directed by	Original release date	Viewers (millions)
–	"The Mind of Jake Paul – Teaser Trailer"	Shane Dawson and Andrew Siwicki	September 11, 2018	7.3+
The video shows Shane watching YouTube videos of Jake Paul. Shane expresses concern over how Jake will react to the series.
–	"The Mind of Jake Paul – Extended Trailer"	Shane Dawson and Andrew Siwicki	September 21, 2018	6.4+
The video starts with Shane giving hints about the idea he is formulating. He also states he will be using secret cameras to film things against Jake Paul's wishes.
1	"The Mind of Jake Paul"	Shane Dawson and Andrew Siwicki	September 25, 2018	27.3+
This episode starts with Shane bringing up criticism of the series. Shane video calls YouTuber iNabber to ask him about the history of Jake and Logan Paul. iNabber tells him the various controversies that the two have been in, and they discuss Jake Paul's YouTube persona.
2	"The Dark Side of Jake Paul"	Shane Dawson and Andrew Siwicki	September 27, 2018	24.9+
Shane meets with a licensed marriage and family counselor (Kati Morton) regarding potential mental disorders of YouTube personalities.
3	"The Family of Jake Paul"	Shane Dawson and Andrew Siwicki	October 1, 2018	19.2+
This episode starts with Shane addressing the controversy regarding the previous episode as well as Logan Paul's response to the series. Shane later performs an armchair analysis of the Paul family, looking at Greg Paul, Jake and Logan's father; as well as Pamala Stepnick, their mother. He declares his intent to interview Nick Crompton, a former member of Team 10, to investigate both Jake and Greg Paul's management of Team 10.
4	"The Enemies of Jake Paul"	Shane Dawson and Andrew Siwicki	October 3, 2018	21.7+
Shane Dawson goes to Nick Crompton's house, interviews him, and discusses the controversies behind Team 10, such as the Alissa Violet drama and why Nick left.
5	"The World of Jake Paul"	Shane Dawson and Andrew Siwicki	October 8, 2018	22.5+
Shane goes to the Team 10 House for the first time and meets Jake Paul face to face. Shane has Kati go undercover as his producer in order to examine Jake and his behavior in real life.
6	"The Secrets of Jake Paul"	Shane Dawson and Andrew Siwicki	October 11, 2018	17.1+
Shane goes to Walmart with Team 10, and talks to Jake and Erika about the allegation that FaZe Banks assaulted Jake's assistant. Shane interviews Erika one-on-one about the influences in Jake's life.
7	"The Ex Girlfriend of Jake Paul"	Shane Dawson and Andrew Siwicki	October 16, 2018	20.5+
Shane goes to the Clout Gang and meets Alissa Violet, interviews her, and discusses the real truth about the drama that happened last year with her and Jake. She discusses her experience with him in the Team 10 House as well as the Logan Paul and Jake Paul cheating drama.
8	"Inside The Mind of Jake Paul"	Shane Dawson and Andrew Siwicki	October 18, 2018	30.4+
In the series finale, Shane interviews Jake about his past controversies, including the Martinez Twins' departure from Team 10, past disturbances in his neighborhood during filming his vlogs, the allegation that FaZe Banks assaulted Jake's assistant, Logan Paul's suicide video controversy, and his past relationship with Alissa Violet.

== Reception ==
The Mind of Jake Paul generally received mixed reviews. Patricia Hernandez, writing for The Verge, called Dawson the "king of YouTube," yet acknowledged the backlash after "The Dark Side of Jake Paul" was published. Steven Asarch of Newsweek also acknowledged the backlash, but nevertheless concluded that, by the end of the series, most thought that Paul wasn't "just a crazy 'sociopath' who screams at babies and plugs his merchandise for most of his videos." Becky Freeth, writing for Metro, also noted most reacted positively to Jake Paul after the series. CJ Feist, writing for Bradley University's The Bradley Scout, noted that while some criticized the second episode for seemingly trying to diagnose Jake Paul without his knowledge, no matter what, "it is an interesting watch and certainly exciting to experience." Julia Alexander, writing for Polygon, applauded Dawson for making the series feel like "it’s unfolding in real time." The series has over 175 million views in total.

Negative reviews mostly criticized the second episode of The Mind of Jake Paul for its editing style and usage of the term "sociopath." Tanya Chen and Remy Smidt, writing for BuzzFeed News, criticized Dawson for using the "outdated term" sociopath, and stated he should rather use the term antisocial personality disorder. They particularly criticized the second episode for using the term; Lauren Strapagiel, another Buzzfeed News reporter, concurred with Chen and Smidt. Jacob Shamsian, writing for Insider, also criticized the second episode, stating it was edited like a "horror movie." Adam White from The Telegraph summarized the criticism, stating: "So far it has been Dawson who has become the target of significant backlash, emerging as a vaguely ignorant figure putting profitability before mental health, while Paul has emerged as his more level-headed mirror image, curious if slightly miffed by where this all seems to be going." Carolyn Todd, writing for Self, did a full investigation on the topics presented in The Mind of Jake Paul. Todd validates the criticism by Chen and Smidt, and disputes most of Morton's claims.

Jake Paul responded to the first two videos, stating that "the sociopathic stuff doesn't interest me." Logan Paul, Jake's brother, made a video in response to the word "sociopath" being "thrown around" in the videos; Logan mentions he has sociopathic tendencies. Dawson apologized for anyone who was offended, but stated his "intentions were not bad." Dawson also states he never had the intent to diagnose others. Kati Morton also made a video to respond to the criticism she received for her comments about sociopaths in the second episode: she claimed her intention was to educate those who are not sociopaths so they do not fall victim to manipulation from sociopaths and said of Dawson, "I applaud him for even reaching out to me and asking a real mental health professional to weigh in on something".

=== Professional criticism ===
A paper written by Kristiana Naydenova, published on Diggit, reviewed the production aspect of the series. Naydenova noted that the series espouses traditional documentaries published on YouTube and it does not provide "substantial knowledge about Jake Paul’s character." Naydenova noted elements of a reflexive documentary for the first episode and that the series contained observations even though it wasn't an observational documentary. Ultimately, Naydenova concluded that the series was mostly participatory, though she criticized it for not containing any real insights to Paul and for Dawson and Morton not actually being subject-matter experts. Todd interviewed mental health experts during her investigation, who noted that sociopathy is not a true clinical diagnosis and is outdated. Additionally, they pointed out that antisocial personality disorder is notoriously difficult to diagnose and noted the danger in "armchair diagnosing."

An essay written by Chris Eaket for the journal Critical Stages analyzed the notion of authenticity on YouTube. Eaket says that "by the end of the series, the mental state of Jake Paul is a moot point," and the series shifts to cover "[the precarious] nature of online authenticity." Furthermore, he notes the amount that both Paul and Dawson made in 2018, the subsequent pranks and promotion at Team 10 because of Paul's revenue and concludes that authenticity on YouTube is defined by culture.
