= Jeffree Star Cosmetics =

American cosmetics company

Jeffree Star Cosmetics, Inc.
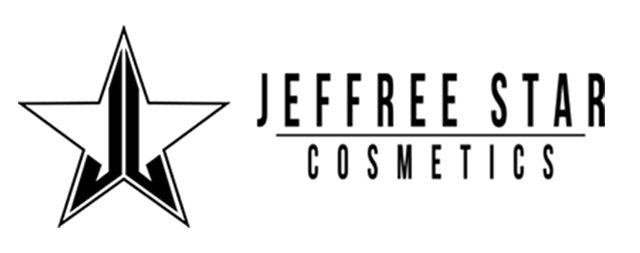
- Logo of Jeffree Star Cosmetics
- Type: Private
- Industry: Cosmetics
- Founded: November 2014
- Founder: Jeffree Star
- Headquarters: Chatsworth, California, U.S.
- Area served: Worldwide
- Products: Cosmetics, beauty products
- Owners: Jeffree Star; Jeff Cohen
- Number of employees: 100 (2019)
- Website: www.jeffreestarcosmetics.com

Jeffree Star Cosmetics, Inc. is an American cosmetics company founded by Internet personality and musician Jeffree Star. Star invested his life savings to start the company's makeup line in 2014, later detailing the bankruptcy he had been facing following his music career. It launched with three liquid lipstick colors. All products are vegan and cruelty-free. The company is co-owned by Star and his business partner Jeff Cohen.

The company was once estimated to sell $100 million annually. In 2022, the brand was estimated to have an annual revenue of $45 million, according to NeoReach. In 2023, the brand was estimated to have received $31.7 million for the year in revenue, according to Zawya.

== Background ==
The company was conceived by Star in 2013. Star terminated his music career and invested fully into the company. In November 2014, the cosmetics company launched a collection of 3 Velour liquid lipsticks. The company is co-owned by Star and his business partner Jeff Cohen, who was an early investor in the company.

== Products ==
The company produces lipsticks, concealers, setting powders, highlighters, lip products, jackets, and mirrors. The company randomly sells mystery boxes on their website, including a mini box, premium box, and deluxe box. Seven products—the "Androgyny" palette, the "Magic Star" setting powder and concealer, the "Velour Liquid Lipstick", the "Thirsty" palette, the "Liquid Frost" highlighter, and the "Blood Sugar" palette—were Cosmopolitan's favorite company products. Products sold by the company are vegan and cruelty-free.

=== 2016 ===
In an interview for Nylon in April 2016, Star revealed the company's first eye shadow palette, titled "Beauty Killer", which was named after his only studio album. He also stated that he wanted to expand the company's products to include his "own moisturizer and foundation". Like the palette following it, it included 10 shades.

=== 2017 ===
In January 2017, Star revealed another eye shadow palette, titled "Androgyny". It was released in March 2017. Star named the palette after his "theme [of] life", and colors featured in the palette dramatically changed. He also revealed a "skin frost highlighter palette". The company launched "The Star Family Collection" in October 2017. Some shade names were made from Star's pet Pomeranians.

=== 2018 ===
In January 2018, Star revealed the "Blood Sugar" palette, which included 18 shades highlighting red tones. It was released on January 29(PR), and February 10 respectively in the company's lovesick collection. For the company's summer collection, Star revealed another palette titled "Thirsty".

In August 2018, the first East Coast location to carry the cosmetics line was a Morphe Cosmetics store in Paramus, New Jersey. In October 2018, the company started selling its products in Belgium and the Netherlands, followed by France in November.

In November 2018, Star released an "Alien" palette, coinciding with the release of a holiday collection, which contained liquid lipsticks and lip scrubs. It included the same number of shades as the "Blood Sugar" palette. The aforementioned "skin frost palette", a highlighting palette titled "Supreme Frost Pro", was finally released in December 2018.

=== 2019 ===
In March 2019, a successor to the "Blood Sugar" palette, "Blue Blood", was released. This palette highlighted blue toned shades and featured a casket shape. A collection coinciding with the palette also released. On April 2, 2019, Star announced that one of the company's warehouses had been robbed; around US$2,500,000 was lost. Items stolen from the warehouse included the eyeshadow palette "Blue Blood" and a then-unreleased concealer, Magic Star. Some stolen products were resold on other websites. He consequently announced that "Magic Star" would be launched in May. As revealed in The Beautiful World of Jeffree Star, no leads were discovered by the FBI.

In May 2019, Star revealed the company's first lip gloss collection, titled "The Gloss". In August, Star announced that a collaborative palette with Morphe would be released. In conjunction with the palette, a brush set was launched. Star stated that the collaboration was created mainly to make a palette that has a cheaper price point. Unlike Androgyny, the collaborative palette contained 30 shades. Jawbreaker, the company's "biggest release to date", was released in June 2019, along with a summer collection. A smaller palette titled "Mini Breaker" was also released.

In October 2019, Shane Dawson's documentary series The Beautiful World of Jeffree Star showcased behind the scenes of Jeffree Star Cosmetics. The series also documents the production of a new product line, created by Star and Dawson. Star revealed he had made over $20 million for his "Blood Sugar" palette. On November 1, 2019, The Conspiracy Collection became available through the company's website and Morphe locations. Excessive traffic resulted in outages on Shopify and Morphe.com lasting hours.

Two mystery boxes were launched on the website, a later one being a Halloween-themed one. The first one was criticized by some for not including beauty products in one box and missing items in another. However, the first one received mostly positive reviews. The second one, released in October 2019, was criticized by some who received broken products.

=== 2020 ===
In February 2020, Star released his "Blood Lust" collection, which included the purple-themed 18-pan Blood Lust Palette, 5 Glosses, a new purple Extreme Frost shade, and the Mini Purple Velour Liquid Lipstick Bundle. The Blood Lust Palette is the third palette in the "Blood Collection".

In July 2020, Morphe ceased commercial activities with the company over allegations of racism, blackmail and manipulation against Jeffree Star.

In August 2020, Star released his "Orgy" collection, which was his first nude-colored collection. The collection included the 30-pan Orgy Palette, the 9-pan Mini Orgy Palette, 6 new Glosses, a 25-set Nude Mini Lipstick Vault, and a new Magic Star Luminous Setting Powder.

In November 2020, Star released his "Blood Money" collection, which included the green-themed 18-pan Blood Money Palette, 4 Glosses, a Lip Balm, 2 new Extreme Frost shades, the Mini Green Velour Liquid Lipstick Bundle, and the debut of the Automatic Eyeliner in 5 shades. Blood Money is the fourth palette in the "Blood Collection".

=== 2021 ===
In late January 2021, Star introduced the second gloss formula to his brand called the Supreme Gloss, which came in a variety of shades including some new and some which are Velour Liquid Lipstick shades.

In February, Star announced the release of another collection titled the "Blood Sugar Anniversary Collection" in honour of the anniversary of the original Blood Sugar collection. It features a new palette, the Mini Blood Sugar Palette, a red-themed Velour Liquid Lipstick collection, a Cavity Skin Frost Highlighter Palette, and a relaunch of the Blood Sugar Palette. The collection was released on February 26.

In July, Star announced his "Pink Religion" collection, which included the pink-themed 18-pan Pink Religion Palette, the Sacred Glass Extreme Frost Palette, 8 new Velvet Trap shades, 4 Hydrating Glitz Lip Balm shades, and the Holy Mist Smoothing Facial Spray. The collection released on July 30.

== Lawsuits ==
In April 2017, Jeffree Star Cosmetics, alongside Jeffree Star and Manny MUA, were sued for copyright infringement by Black Moon cosmetics. The case was later settled.

In July 2017, LunatiCK Cosmetics filed a trademark lawsuit against Jeffree Star Cosmetics for the packaging of the Lip Ammunition. In November 2017, LunatiCK filed to dismiss the case, and the case was closed in April 2018.

In October 2020, Jeffree Star Cosmetics alongside 10 unnamed people were sued by the estate of Anna Nicole Smith for copyright infringement.
