= Jaclyn Hill =

American internet personality

- Born: Jaclyn Roxanne Eilers; July 20, 1990 (age 36); Illinois, U.S
- Occupations: YouTuber; entrepreneur
- Spouses: Jon Hill (m. 2009; div. 2018) Jordan Torrey (m. 2023)

YouTube information
- Channel: Jaclynhill1
- Years active: 2011–present
- Genres: Beauty; vlog
- Subscribers: 5.38 million
- Views: 634 million
- Last updated: August 4, 2026
- Website: jaclyncosmetics.com

Jaclyn Roxanne Torrey (née Eilers; born July 20, 1990) is an American entrepreneur and internet personality who gained popularity via her YouTube channel.

== Early life ==
Jaclyn Eilers grew up near Mineral, Illinois, on a 700-acre commercial farm that had been in her family for four generations.

In 1998, Jaclyn's family—including her father James, mother Robin, older brother Nicholas, and older sister Rachel—moved to Tampa, Florida, after her father said he was called by God to pursue missionary work and become an evangelist. For the next several years, the family traveled to countries including India and Honduras to preach Christianity. Hill has been estranged from her father since her parents' divorce in 2012.

Hill was homeschooled during her childhood. She attended college in Sarasota, Florida, where she studied photography before dropping out after her freshman year. Hill formerly worked as a freelance makeup artist and at a MAC Cosmetics store.

== Career ==
=== YouTube ===
In 2011, Hill started her YouTube channel, which became known for its celebrity makeup tutorials. In July 2017, she filmed a video with Kim Kardashian, titled "Get Ready with Me & Kim Kardashian", which has become one of Hill's most viewed videos.

=== Collaborations ===
In 2015, Hill collaborated with Australian cosmetics brand BECCA to release a highlighter called "Champagne Pop". Beauty retailer Sephora sold more than 25,000 units of "Champagne Pop" within 20 minutes of its release, breaking sales records. BECCA was bought by Estée Lauder for $200 million in 2017.

In 2015, Hill also collaborated with Morphe Cosmetics, creating a palette containing her favorite Morphe eye shadows. She released a limited-edition, gem-encrusted makeup brush set with Morphe in 2016, as well as a second eye shadow palette, under the marketing name "Jaclyn Hill x Morphe", in 2017. All three products sold out quickly. In June 2018, Hill released her vault collection with Morphe. She said in her vault release video that these were the shades she didn't choose for her Morphe X Jaclyn Hill palette. The vault consists of 4 palettes with 10 pans. They too sold out quickly.

Hill's collaborations with BECCA and Morphe were reported to have sold $10.7 million and $12.2 million in EMVs, respectively.

=== Jaclyn Cosmetics ===
On May 23, 2019, Hill published a YouTube video announcing the launch of her namesake brand, Jaclyn Cosmetics. Although Hill presented the company as a family-owned brand, the brand was owned by Forma Brands, confirmed when the latter entered bankruptcy proceedings in January 2023.

As well as launching the brand, Hill announced the launch of her first product, introducing 20 nude "So Rich Lipstick" shades that would be released within the week. This announcement was initially met with mostly positive reactions from long-time fans but some critics expressed concern over promotional imagery that showed inconsistencies with pigment. The product was launched on May 30, 2019, and sold out that same day. Upon the receipt of their orders, some customers quickly noticed issues in quality, with some consumers reporting that their lipstick either arrived melted or that it broke after a single use. While some defended the brand by saying hot temperatures and shipping conditions were to blame, many continued to voice their concerns with the product's quality on social media. Photos were shared depicting various issues, such as air bubbles, gritty texture, hair, and what many assumed to be mold. Hill stated in response that she had not seen anyone complain, and suggested that the use of the lipstick in conjunction with other lip products was the cause of compromised quality, but assured customers that she would refund or replace products that were found to be faulty.

Further customers reported allergic reactions to the product, with some experiencing itching, swelling, redness, and cold sores. A petition was created calling for the lipsticks to be recalled, to which Hill did not respond. Hill addressed these concerns on June 12, 2019, publishing a video to her YouTube channel titled "My Lipsticks", in which she explained the potential causes of damage during the manufacturing process, extended her apologies to fans and customers, and reiterated to viewers that she intended to compensate those who shared their dissatisfaction with her team.

Hill's video was not well received. In response, Hill temporarily deleted her Instagram and Twitter accounts on July 3, leaving only her YouTube channel available to the public. In 2021, Hill relaunched her cosmetics line with a Valentine's Day collection. She continued to launch products until 2022. In January 2023, Morphe's parent company, Forma, declared bankruptcy. At the time, Morphe owed Hill $2 million in unsecured claims. That March, Morphe′s main creditors bought Forma for $690 million. In January 2024, Hill announced the closure of Jaclyn Hill Cosmetics.

== Personal life ==
Hill lives in Tampa, Florida. She married drummer Jon Hill in August 2009. After almost 9 years of marriage, the couple announced their divorce on May 16, 2018. Jaclyn stated, "We made good friends, not partners in life." Hill started dating Jordan Torrey in 2018. They married on April 29th, 2023 and moved to California in April 2024.
