= Conspiracy Series with Shane Dawson =

Documentary web series by Shane Dawson

- Genre: Web series
- Created by: Shane Dawson
- Developed by: Shane Dawson
- Starring: Shane Dawson; Brittani Louise Taylor; Andrew Siwicki; Ryland Adams; Morgan Adams; Garrett Watts
- No. of seasons: 1
- No. of episodes: 3

Production
- Production locations: Los Angeles, California
- Editors: Shane Dawson; Andrew Siwicki
- Camera setup: Single-camera
- Running time: 28–105 minutes

Original release
- Network: YouTube
- Release: January 30, 2019 – February 5, 2020

Related
- The Mind of Jake Paul; The Return of Eugenia Cooney

Conspiracy Series with Shane Dawson is an American documentary web series created by YouTuber Shane Dawson. The web series was officially announced on January 18, 2019, through a video teaser uploaded to his YouTube channel. The series premiered on January 30, 2019, on his YouTube channel, followed by the second and final episode on February 11, 2019. However, on February 4, 2020, Dawson announced another episode set for release the following day. The series is presented by Dawson, who presents and investigates various conspiracy theories. It is edited by Dawson and cameraman Andrew Siwicki.

The first episode included two of the 2018 California wildfires, the Woolsey Fire and the Camp Fire and their causes; deepfakes; whether children can be brainwashed by dark themes in cartoons; Walt Disney being cryonically frozen; and Hollister and Abercrombie & Fitch using subliminal messaging. As part of the episodes, Dawson and friends explore and test iPhone theories involving Live Photos, phone calls, FaceTime, and social networking app Zepeto. Dawson also visits for himself the damage caused by the wildfires. It received critical acclaim for its direction, mature themes and dark tone. The first video achieved over 22 million views in the first week. The second episode received over 10 million views in the first 24 hours, and featured Dawson investigating YouTuber Brittani Louise Taylor's struggles with domestic abuse and human trafficking, Adobe Voco and Lyrebird voice manipulation, and Chuck E. Cheese pizzas.

== Cast ==
- Shane Dawson: The host and creator of the series
- Brittani Louise Taylor: Dawson's friend and a family-vlog YouTuber
- Andrew Siwicki: The co-director, co-editor, and cameraman of the series
- Ryland Adams: Dawson's fiancé (then boyfriend) who is also a YouTuber
- Morgan Adams: Ryland's sister and a fellow YouTuber
- Garrett Watts: Dawson's friend and a fellow YouTuber

== Episodes ==
No.	Title	Directed by	Original release date	Viewers (millions)
1	"Conspiracy Theories with Shane Dawson"	Shane Dawson and Andrew Siwicki	January 30, 2019	50+
This episode includes main topics: the 2018 California wildfires Woolsey Fire and Camp Fire (2018) and their real causes; deepfakes are dangerous and could end the world; children can be brainwashed by dark themes in cartoons; Walt Disney being cryonically frozen is covered up by the Disney film Frozen; and Hollister and Abercrombie & Fitch using subliminal messaging. These topics were accompanied with Dawson and his friends exploring and testing iPhone theories involving Live Photos, phone calls, FaceTime, and social networking app Zepeto. Dawson also visits for himself the damage caused by the wildfires.
2	"Investigating Conspiracies with Shane Dawson"	Shane Dawson and Andrew Siwicki	February 11, 2019	44.7+
Dawson investigates three topics in the video including: Chuck E. Cheese's recycled pizza theory; voice manipulation tools Adobe Voco and Lyrebird; and interview with Brittani Louise Taylor, a YouTuber who released a book detailing her struggles with domestic abuse in December 2018 and the events that surrounded her pregnancy and abusive relationship.
3	"Conspiracy Theories: Warning Signs"	Shane Dawson and Andrew Siwicki	February 5, 2020	13.9+

== Responses ==
Dawson's video on Chuck E. Cheese's leftover pizza garnered a response from the company's spokesperson: "The claims made in this video about Chuck E. Cheese's and our pizza are unequivocally false ... No conspiracies here—our pizzas are made to order and we prepare our dough fresh in restaurant, which means that they’re not always perfectly uniform in shape, but always delicious."

Dawson's videos also created a response from YouTube, who said "as part of our ongoing efforts to improve the user experience across our site, we'll begin reducing recommendations of borderline content or videos that could misinform users in harmful ways." Initially the video was demonetized by YouTube, however this decision was later reversed. The company announced that "after manual review, YouTube reinstated Dawson's ability to include ads on the video, saying it wasn't in violation of the site's advertising guidelines. It was also able to appear on the front page and be recommended to other users."
