= Jeffree Star =

American internet personality (born 1985)

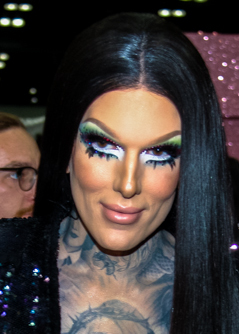
- Star in May 2018
- Born: Jeffrey Lynn Steininger Jr. November 15, 1985 (age 40); Los Angeles County, California, U.S.
- Occupations: Internet personality; makeup artist; singer; songwriter
- Years active: 2003–present
- Title: Founder and owner of Jeffree Star Cosmetics

YouTube information
- Channel: jeffreestar
- Genres: Vlog; makeup; beauty
- Subscribers: 15.6 million
- Views: 2.61 billion
- Musical career
- Genres: Electropop; synth-pop; electronic rock; crunkcore
- Years active: 2005–2014, 2024–present
- Labels: Popsicle; Independent; Konlive
- Last updated: April 23, 2026
- Website: jeffreestar.com

Jeffree Star (born Jeffrey Lynn Steininger Jr., November 15, 1985) is an American makeup artist, media personality and singer-songwriter. He is the founder and owner of Jeffree Star Cosmetics.

In 2009, Star released his debut studio album, Beauty Killer, which included songs such as "Lollipop Luxury" (which has a remix featuring Nicki Minaj). He embarked on several world tours to promote his music. In 2010, he signed to Konlive, but abruptly left the music industry by 2013, citing legal issues the label's owner faced between 2007 and 2010. Star returned to the music industry in 2024 announcing a re-release of his album Beauty Killer featuring 3 new songs. In November 2014, Star founded the company Jeffree Star Cosmetics. In 2018, Forbes revealed that he had earned $18 million from his YouTube endeavors alone, making him the fifth-highest-paid YouTuber that year.

== Early life ==
Jeffrey Lynn Steininger Jr. was born in Los Angeles County, California, on November 15, 1985, and grew up in Orange County, California. He says that he began experimenting with his mother's makeup as a child, and convinced her to let him wear it to school when he was in junior high. Star attended Pacifica High School in Garden Grove, California, from which he graduated in 2002. After high school, he legally changed his name to Jeffree Star and supported himself with various makeup, modeling, and music jobs in Los Angeles. He recalls his early years, spending his weekends using a fake ID to attend Hollywood clubs, which is where celebrities would hire him as a personal makeup artist.

== Career ==
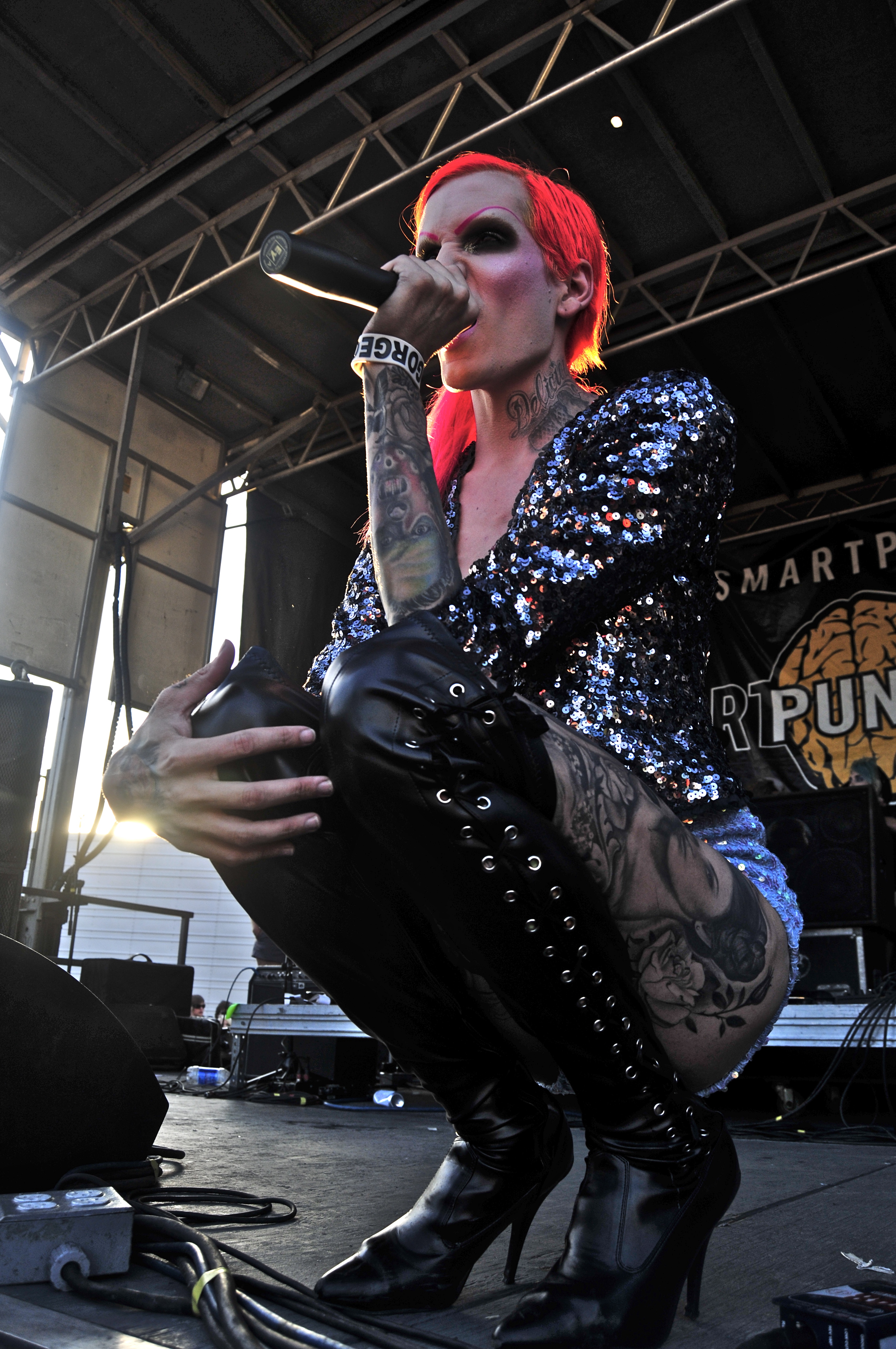
Star in July 2009

=== MySpace ===
Star used MySpace to further both his music and his fashion design career. Using MySpace like a blog, Star shared his personal life, while also providing social commentary on "self-image and confidence", fame and beauty. Due to his use of several websites, Star already had a built-up fan base who signed up to join him on MySpace, giving his profile a large number of friends from its inception. His MySpace photoshoots would frequently gain over 50,000 comments. He also gained fame as one of the most popular independent artists, with the daily rankings placing him in the top tier on MySpace.

=== Music career ===
Star's career as an electronica and pop vocalist began when he befriended Peaches' drummer Samantha Maloney, who encouraged him to make music. In 2005 he was featured on the Hollywood Undead song Turn Off The Lights. During the summer of 2007, he was advertised as a part of the True Colors Tour 2007, which traveled through 15 cities in the United States and Canada. The tour, sponsored by the LGBT Logo channel, began on June 8, 2007, to coincide with Pride month.

Star released his first and only studio album Beauty Killer in 2009, which peaked at number seven on the US Billboard Top Electronic Albums chart. The album included songs such as "Lollipop Luxury" featuring Nicki Minaj. He embarked on several world tours to promote his music. In 2010, he signed to Konlive with plans to release a second album. However, it was never released and Star abruptly left the music industry in 2013 under unclear circumstances.

He appeared in the second version of Kesha's music video for her single "Take It Off" in 2010. Star has worked with several other musical performers, including Blood on the Dance Floor, Deuce, Millionaires, and Larry Tee.

However, on September 15, 2024, Jeffree announced a 15 Year Anniversary release of his 2009 album Beauty Killer alongside a mini-eyeshadow palette of the same name through his YouTube channel. The release saw a new album cover with 3 new songs and with some tracks remastered. A Digital EP called 'Lollipop Killer' was also announced. The anniversary album was released in both CDs and several versions of Vinyls. The album was available for pre-order after the announcement.

=== Conflicts with other media personalities ===
Star's quarrels with other media personalities include conversations with tattoo artist Kat Von D, who accused Star of "drug use, racism, and bullying"; Tati Westbrook, who accused Star and Shane Dawson of forcing her to upload a video attacking fellow beauty YouTuber James Charles, whose brother, Ian Jeffrey, was also bullied by Star on Twitter; Kylie Jenner, whose products were criticized by Star; Kim Kardashian; and Jerrod Blandino, co-founder of Too Faced Cosmetics.

In 2010, Star called Blood on the Dance Floor member Dahvie Vanity, who was arrested in 2009 on sexual assault charges, a "child fucker", tweeting that he saw Vanity "bring underage girls to his hotel room [...] 100% ILLEGAL". Star said he witnessed Vanity's actions in 2012. Other tweets show Star telling people to "get over the negativity" against Vanity and promoting a Blood on the Dance Floor album. He was accused of attempting to profit off Vanity's continued success by associating with him despite knowing about sexual assault allegations. Following a HuffPost report detailing sexual assault – before and after 2010 – against 21 individuals (many of whom were minors), Chris Hansen of To Catch a Predator started covering the story. Speaking to Hansen on YouTube, Star said he had no knowledge of any inappropriate activity between Vanity and underage girls while they worked together, and that his tweets were based on hearsay.

=== Jeffree Star Cosmetics ===
In 2014, Star founded his e-commerce makeup brand, Jeffree Star Cosmetics. In a five-part docuseries by Shane Dawson, Star stated that the end of his music career had left him essentially bankrupt, and that he had used his remaining savings to start his makeup brand. Star began promoting the brand through videos published on YouTube, leading to the success of his YouTube channel, with 15.8 million subscribers and over 2.5 billion views as of December 2023. Bustle magazine described Star as "a musician and onetime MySpace celeb that reinvented himself in the YouTube makeup tutorial space." His first cosmetics release was a collection of velour liquid lipsticks, which were followed by highlighter palettes, lip scrubs, eyeshadow palettes, clothing, and accessories, such as mirrors and make up bags. The first East Coast location to carry the cosmetics line was a Morphe Cosmetics store at the Westfield Garden State Plaza in Paramus, New Jersey on August 11, 2018. Star has since launched several successful collections, such as the "Blue Blood" eyeshadow palette.

== Personal life ==
Star was in a relationship with Nathan Schwandt from 2015 to January 2020. He also says that he avoids cigarettes and hard drugs, although he does smoke cannabis.

As of December 2020, Star resides in Casper, Wyoming.

On Taylor Lewan and Will Compton's podcast Bussin With The Boys in 2023, Star said "conservatives like me because I'm just real" after expressing his disdain for non-binary people and the label. He showed support for Charlie Kirk in September 2025 after Kirk's death arguing that "Charlie Kirk fought for the truth." In November 2025 on The Skinny Confidential podcast, Star urged the T and Q to be removed from LGBTQ. He also claimed that he does not identify with the gay label stating "I'm just open and very me".

=== Health ===
Star has noted several times about using an inhaler to treat his asthma, which he was diagnosed with at childhood.

Star has publicly spoken about his mental health in his series The Secret World of Jeffree Star; stating that he used to suffer from depression and that he would commit self-harm.

== Controversies ==
Star was accused of racism due to derogatory remarks about minorities. He later apologized for the remarks. A satirical skit between Star and a drag queen was posted on MySpace, in which Star states he wants to throw battery acid on a black woman to lighten her skin so it will match her foundation.

In June 2020, Star apologized after images and an archive of his former website Lipstick Nazi resurfaced. The website featured swastikas alongside photos of Star engaging in self-harm.

In an October 2020 report by journalist Kat Tenbarge, Star was accused of multiple instances of sexual assault, assault, and paying $10,000 in hush money to accusers. An attorney for Star denied all the allegations. Leaked documents later appeared to show one of Star's accusers being paid $45,000 by a Jeffree Star Cosmetics executive.

== Filmography ==
Year	Title	Role	Director	Notes
2007	LA Ink	Himself	Aaron Krummel	2 episodes
2011	LA Ink	Himself	Fred Villari	2 episodes
2015	What Now	Victoria	Ash Avildsen	Feature film
2017	Shane and Friends	Himself	Shane Dawson	Podcast
2018	The Secret World of Jeffree Star	Himself	Shane Dawson	Docu-series; 5 episodes
2019	The Beautiful World of Jeffree Star	Himself	Shane Dawson	Docu-series; 8 episodes
2020	The Dish with Trish	Himself	Trisha Paytas	Guest appearance

== Discography ==
=== Studio albums ===
Title	Album details	Peak chart positions			
Title	Album details	US	US Elec	US Heat	US Indie
Beauty Killer	Release date: September 22, 2009; Label: Popsicle; Formats: CD, digital download	122	7	2	22

=== Extended plays ===
Title	Details	Peak chart positions	
Title	Details	US Elec	US Heat
Plastic Surgery Slumber Party	Released: March 13, 2007; Label: Self-released; Format: Digital download	—	—
Cupcakes Taste Like Violence	Released: December 9, 2008; Label: Popsicle; Format: CD, digital download	6	8
Virginity	Released: February 14, 2012; Label: Popsicle; Format: Digital download	—	—
Mr. Diva	Released: October 2, 2012; Label: Popsicle, KonLive Distribution; Format: Digital download, vinyl	—	—
Lollipop Killer	Released: September 20, 2024; Label: Pink Religion Music; Format: Digital download, vinyl	—	—

=== Singles ===
Title	Year	Album
"Lollipop Luxury"	2008	Cupcakes Taste Like Violence
"Prisoner"	2009	Beauty Killer
"Prom Night"	2012	Non-album single
"Mr. Diva"	2012	Mr. Diva and Lollipop Killer
"Love to My Cobain"	2013	Lollipop Killer

== Awards and nominations ==
Year	Ceremony	Category	Result	Ref.
2019	9th Streamy Awards	Beauty	Nominated	
2020	12th Annual Shorty Awards	YouTuber of the Year	Nominated	
