= Morphe Cosmetics =

American cosmetic retailer

Morphe Holdings LLC
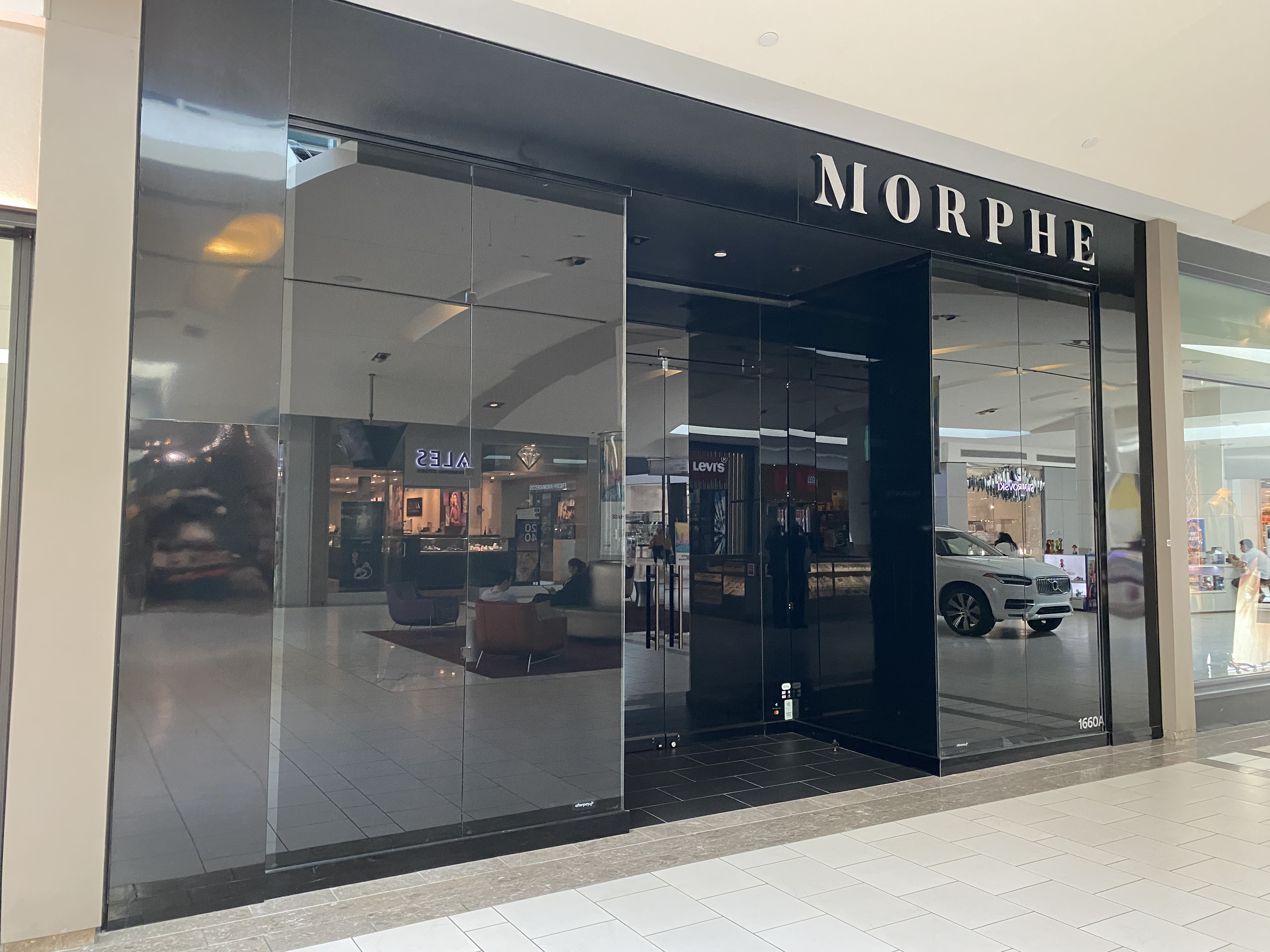
- Closed Morphe store in Dadeland Mall, Kendall, Florida
- Trade name: MORPHE, Morphe Cosmetics
- Type: Privately Held, Subsidiary
- Industry: Cosmetics
- Founded: November 2008; 18 years ago Los Angeles, California, U.S.
- Founders: Chris Tawil & Linda Tawil, Summit Partners
- Headquarters: Los Angeles, California, U.S.
- Products: Cosmetics
- Parent: General Atlantic Forma Brands LLC
- Website: www.morphe.com

Morphe Cosmetics, also known as Morphe Brushes and legally known as Morphe Holdings (stylized as MORPHE), is a Los Angeles–based cosmetics and beauty manufacturer founded in 2008 by Chris Tawil and Linda Tawil. The company specializes in direct-to-consumer distribution of beauty and personal care products through digital retail, leveraging partnerships with social media influencers. Morphe has severed ties with multiple partners following controversies involving several influencers.

In August 2019, Morphe Holdings announced a new partnership with General Atlantic, which acquired a majority stake in the company. The additional terms of the deal were not disclosed, but Morphe' existing shareholders continued to be investors in the company.

In 2020 Morphe integrated into Forma Brands.

On January 5, 2023, Morphe announced on social media that all its U.S. stores would close immediately, citing criticism of employee working conditions and a shift to focus more on their digital storefront. A week later, on January 12, 2023, Morphe's parent company, Forma Brands, filed for Chapter 11 Bankruptcy. At that time, Morphe owed YouTube stars and beauty influencers James Charles, Jaclyn Hill $2 million and Jeffree Star $1.4 million in unsecured claims. In March 2023, Morphe's main creditors, &Vest, Jeffries Finance, and Cerberus Capital Management bought Forma for $690 million.

== Partnerships ==
Morphe initially collaborated with James Charles in 2017, producing two palettes of eyeshadows. However, the company cut ties with Charles in 2021 in response to calls for a boycott after he admitted to inappropriately texting two 16-year-old boys when he was in his early 20s.

Morphe partnered with Shane Dawson and Jeffree Star but severed ties with them in 2020. This decision came amid online criticism of the brand following a feud between beauty vloggers Tati Westbrook and James Charles, as well as accusations of racism against Star.

Other noticeable partnerships for Morphe include collaborations with Manny Gutierrez, Nikita Dragun, Jaclyn Hill, Maddie Ziegler, Avani Gregg, Lisa Frank. Madison Beer, Jackie Aina, Charli D'Amelio, Dixie D'Amelio, and Bretman Rock. In addition, Morphe collaborated with Coca-Cola in 2020 and 2021.

In 2023, Morphe closed all U.S. stores.

On August 4, 2024, Morphe closed their stores in the United Kingdom to focus online.
