= Maddie Zahm =

- Zahm performing October 25, 2026
- Born: March 7, 1998 (age 28); Boise Idaho, U.S.
- Years active: 2018–Present
- Known for: pop and alternative/indie rock
- Website: www.maddiezahm.com

Maddie Zahm (born March 7, 1998) is an American singer-songwriter. She has written over 50 songs and has released 3 albums. She has more than 345 million streams from her music worldwide and over 2 billion views on TikTok for "Fat Funny Friend" alone. She is currently on tour for her newest album, Everything All the Time.

In 2018, Zahm made it to the top 50 on season 16 of American Idol. She auditioned with a cover of Dua Lipa's "New Rules" and was eliminated in the Showcase Round. In 2023, she was featured on NPR's All Things Considered.

== Personal life ==
Maddie was born in Boise, Idaho, and currently is based in Los Angeles. In her early life, she was active in the Christian church, and has come out as queer after moving to California. Maddie also spent time studying and teaching special education.

== Discography ==
=== Studio Albums ===
Title	Details
People Pleaser	Released: July 10, 2020
Now That I've Been Honest	Released: October 20, 2023
Everything All the Time	Released: September 25, 2026

=== Songs ===
Title	Year	Album
"Beautifully Human"	2018	N/A
"Kill Me"	2019	N/A
"Famous Love Song"	2020	People Pleaser
"Everything to Me"	2020	People Pleaser
"I'm Not Your Mom"	2020	People Pleaser
"People Pleaser"	2020	People Pleaser
"Sober"	2020	People Pleaser
"We Can't Be Friends"	2020	People Pleaser
"To Be Honest"	2020	People Pleaser
"Biggest Fan"	2020	People Pleaser
"Like Me Anymore"	2020	People Pleaser
"That's How You Know"	2020	People Pleaser
"Leave It at That"	2020	People Pleaser
"If He Had Loved Me"	2020	N/A
"Ways to Break a Heart"	2020	N/A
"Family Reunions"	2021	N/A
"Stupid Boys"	2021	N/A
"How to Be Your Friend	2021	N/A
"Blind Spot"	2021	N/A
"Ex's Side"	2021	N/A
"Fat Funny Friend"	2022	You Might Not Like Her (EP)
"You Might Not Like Her"	2022	You Might Not Like Her (EP)
"If It's Not God"	2022	You Might Not Like Her (EP)
"Pocket Bible"	2022	You Might Not Like Her (EP)
"Inevitable"	2022	You Might Not Like Her (EP)
"Seeing Other People"	2022	N/A
"STEP ON ME"	2023	Now That I've Been Honest
"Where Do All the Good Kids Go"	2023	Now That I've Been Honest
"Eightball Girl"	2023	Now That I've Been Honest
"Thanks For Coming Out"	2023	Now That I've Been Honest
"oh um"	2023	Now That I've Been Honest
"Lady Killer"	2023	Now That I've Been Honest
"Robin Williams"	2023	Now That I've Been Honest
"Dani"	2023	Now That I've Been Honest
"imissyou."	2023	Now That I've Been Honest
"Bedroom"	2023	Now That I've Been Honest
"Lights on Kind of Lover"	2023	Now That I've Been Honest
"Pick Up The Phone"	2023	Now That I've Been Honest
"Growing In"	2023	Now That I've Been Honest
"Little Me"	2024	N/A
"Sheets"	2025	(The angry part) (EP)
"Heaven"	2025	(The angry part) (EP)
"He Calls Me Pretty"	2025	(The angry part) (EP)
"Cannibal"	2025	(The angry part) (EP)
"Mothers & Daughters"	2025	N/A
"Babygirl"	2025	N/A
"Double Date"	2025	N/A
"Cellophane"	2026	N/A
"Realistic Love Song"	2026	N/A
"Everything All the Time"	2026	Everything All the Time
"Meryl"	2026	Everything All the Time
"Drunk Cigarette"	2026	Everything All the Time
"Grave"	2026	Everything All the Time
"Georgia Girl"	2026	Everything All the Time
"Graffiti"	2026	Everything All the Time
"Jezebel"	2026	Everything All the Time
"Hometown Letdown"	2026	Everything All the Time
"Told You So"	2026	Everything All the Time
"No Good at Falling in Love"	2026	Everything All the Time
"The Art of Moving On"	2026	Everything All the Time
