= Nural =

American rock band

- Origin: California, United States
- Genres: Post-grunge; Alternative rock
- Years active: 2000-2013, 2023-present
- Label: Hopeless Records
- Members: Kyle Castellani; Aaron Tyler; Douglas Allen; Charley Hoy; Kyle Black
- Past members: Ryan Davis; John Anderson

Nural is an American band from La Crescenta, California, United States. They formed in 2000 by Kyle Castellani, Ryan Davis, Kyle Black, Charley Hoy, and Aaron Tyler. Douglas Allen, formerly of the bands Shallow and Normal Like You joined the band in 2006.

== History ==
In early 2003, Nural signed their first Record deal with Hopeless Records. They then released their first full-length album titled The Weight Of The World on August 9, 2005. In the beginning of the summer of 2005, they began touring as one of the bands on the Warped Tour, and their single "Tension" appeared as one of the songs on that year's Warped Tour compilation album from Side One Dummy Records. Nural has been between labels for quite some time now and the release of their second album, Entitlement, has been up in the air. Nural posted a blog on their Myspace on February 3, 2009 stating that they are releasing their album on DownloadPunk.com digitally. They're still working on album and art and a book for their official release. Nural released Entitlement B-Sides on September 14, 2010 on iTunes.

Their music also appeared on the soundtrack to the Discovery Channel movie, Drift: The Sideways Craze.

Nural unofficially broke up in 2009 after a legal battle with their management. Several of the members have moved on to different projects. Kyle Castellani released a solo EP in 2011 titled "Pseudo Romance", a full-length album in 2012 titled "Lemonade", a string of singles, and continues to write music for other artists. Kyle Black built and runs his own studio, West Alley Recordings, in Van Nuys, Ca. and has become a go-to producer in the pop-punk & hardcore genres working with artists like Paramore, New Found Glory, State Champs, Pierce the Veil, Comeback Kid, and Strung Out. On January 1, 2012 it was announced on Nural's Facebook page that they were working on an album that was supposed to be released in 2012, but on April 26, 2013 they stated that they had every intention of releasing a new album, but due to each band member having different projects that they were working on, a new album was not in the cards for any of the members.

On October 3, 2013, a tweet was sent out to a fan in regards as to whether or not they are still working on music and they had stated that they are currently not working on any music in the foreseeable future, further confirming that the band has dissolved.

== Reunion ==
The band began teasing new music in April 2023 through Instagram and Facebook. The band has stated that they are working on a single, called "Hit The Reset". The song was released on Spotify on August 1, 2023. On October 13, 2023, The band released a song titled "Here We Go" and a music video for the song was released in February 2024.

== Discography ==
- The Struggle Continues EP (Self-released, 2004)

Track list

1. "Tension"
2. "The Curse"
3. "I Told You So"
4. "Live And Learn"
5. "Spotlight"
6. "Crowded"
7. "The Struggle Continues"
- Weight Of The World (Hopeless Records, 2005)

Track list

1. "Tension"
2. "Chasing You"
3. "The Curse"
4. "Lukewarm"
5. "Not Guilty"
6. "The Root Of All Evil"
7. "Sign Of Life"
8. "Enlighten Me"
9. "I Told You So"
10. "Years To Come"
11. "Forgive Me"
12. "How Do You Sleep At Night"
- Entitlement (Hopeless Records, 2009)

Track list

1. "The Hits Keep Coming"
2. "Stop Me When You've Had Enough"
3. "Physics"
4. "Up Against"
5. "Say What You Will"
6. "Surefire"
7. "I've Been Here Before"
8. "Me Or The Music"
9. "You've Got Some Nerve"
10. "Sweet Oblivion"
- Entitlement B-Sides (Hopeless Records, 2010)

Track list

1. "This Is The Way"
2. "Godspeed"
3. "Adriana"
4. "Kids These Days"
5. "Calmer Waters"
6. "Here Goes Nothing"
7. "Can't Make You Change"
8. "FU Pay Me"
9. "Kylifornia"
10. "Hero"
11. "Calm In Your Eyes"
12. "Stop Me When You've Had Enough (Demo)"
13. "Say What You Will (Demo)"
