= James Charles =

American internet personality (born 1999)

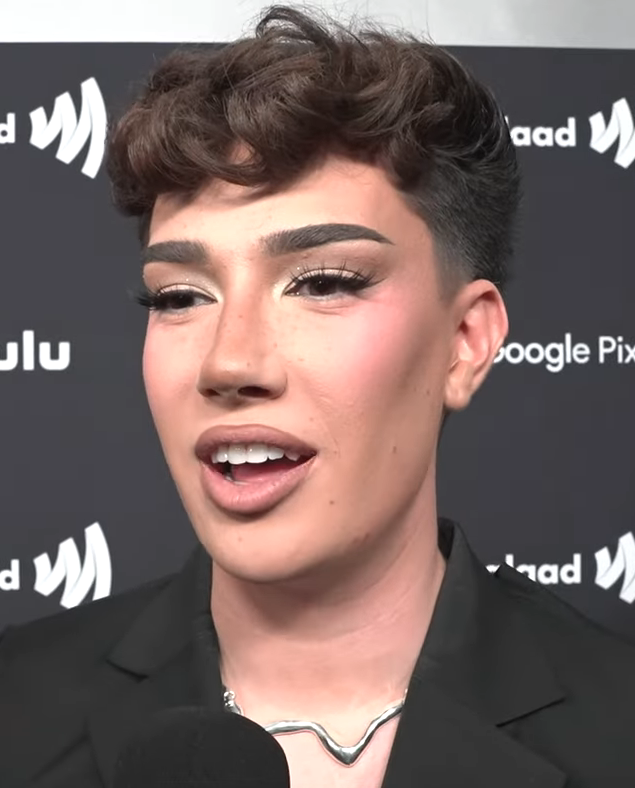
- Charles in 2024
- Born: James Charles Dickinson; May 23, 1999 (age 27); Bethlehem, New York, U.S.
- Occupations: YouTuber; makeup artist
- Years active: 2015–present

Instagram information
- Page: jamescharles
- Followers: 19 million

TikTok information
- Page: jamescharles
- Followers: 39.8 million

YouTube information
- Channel: James Charles
- Genres: Vlog; makeup; beauty
- Subscribers: 23.8 million
- Views: 4.76 billion
- Last updated: July 1, 2026

James Charles Dickinson (born May 23, 1999) is an American YouTuber and makeup artist. While working as a local makeup artist in his hometown of Bethlehem, New York, Charles started a YouTube channel, where he began uploading makeup tutorials. In 2016, he became the first male brand ambassador for CoverGirl after a tweet featuring his makeup went viral online.

In 2020, Charles hosted, directed, and co-produced the YouTube Originals reality competition series Instant Influencer. He has released an eyeshadow palette and created a makeup line in collaboration with Morphe Cosmetics, and has received numerous awards for his work on social media, including two People's Choice Awards, three Streamy Awards, one Shorty Award, and one Teen Choice Award.

His career has included multiple online controversies, including a widely publicized feud with fellow beauty YouTuber Tati Westbrook in 2019 and accusations of sexting with underage boys in 2021; he later stated that he was unaware of their ages at the time.

== Early life ==
James Charles Dickinson was born on May 23, 1999, in Bethlehem, New York, to parents Skip, a contractor, and Christine Dickinson. His younger brother, Ian Jeffrey, works as a model. In 2010, James started a YouTube channel, JaysCoding, where he made song covers and videos about being in the Mario Kart Wii competitive modding community. He attended Bethlehem Central High School, where he graduated in 2017. Describing his high school experience, he stated, "I did get bullied a lot in high school and personally, I just ignored it." Charles began working as an amateur hairstylist and started doing makeup after being asked by a friend to do her makeup for a school dance. After teaching himself how to apply makeup, he soon began doing it professionally for girls in his area.

== Career ==
In December 2015, Charles started a YouTube channel where he began posting makeup tutorials. A tweet of him retaking his senior portrait with a ring light and makeup on went viral in September 2016. In October 2016, when he was 17, he became the first male brand ambassador for cosmetics brand CoverGirl. The appointment was met with significant praise on social media. His first appearance was in advertisements for CoverGirl's So Lashy mascara. He started a clothing line, Sisters Apparel, and a makeup collection, the Sister Collection, made in collaboration with cosmetics brand Morphe Cosmetics, in November 2018.

Crowds at a Canadian mall, anticipating a Morphe Cosmetics appearance by James Charles in 2019

By early 2019, he had 10 million subscribers on YouTube. His January 2019 visit to Birmingham for the opening of Morphe Cosmetics' second United Kingdom store caused gridlock in the city center. Charles did Australian rapper Iggy Azalea's makeup for promotional art for her single "Sally Walker" in March 2019 and appeared in the song's music video. He announced he would go on the Sisters Tour throughout the US in April 2019. However, the tour was canceled the following month following a highly publicized feud with American social media personality Tati Westbrook.

Charles hosted the first season of the YouTube Originals reality competition series Instant Influencer, which premiered on his YouTube channel in April 2020. For his work on the show, he won the award for Show of the Year at the 10th Streamy Awards. In March 2021, YouTube announced that he would not return to host the second season of the show. In October 2020, Charles made a cameo appearance in the music video for American social media personality Larray's single "Canceled".

Since the launch of his channel, Charles has made a number of collaborative videos, doing makeup on and with various public figures including: Kim Kardashian, Kylie Jenner, Lil Nas X, Kesha, Madison Beer, Doja Cat, JoJo Siwa, Charli D'Amelio, Addison Rae, Trixie Mattel, Avani Gregg, and Bretman Rock.

In January 2021, Charles sang a cover of "Drivers License". He released his debut single, "Call Me Back", in February 2024.

== Public image ==
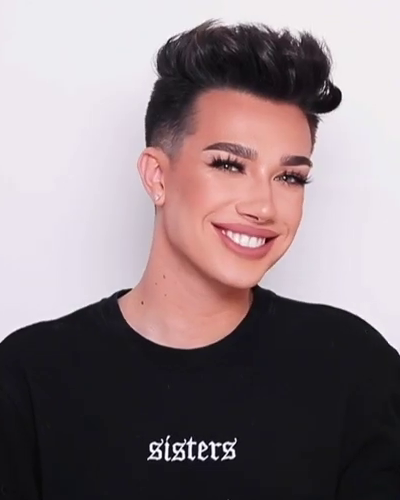
Charles in 2019

Early in his career, Charles received attention for being a young male makeup artist. Todd Spangler of Variety called him "YouTube's most famous beauty vlogger". Writing for the Irish Independent, Caitlin McBride remarked that he "spearheaded a makeup revolution among men", while Amelia Tait of The Guardian wrote that his online platform was "arguably revolutionary". Teen Vogue referred to him in 2019 as "one of the most famous YouTube makeup artists and beauty influencers around", while Noelle Faulkner of Vogue Australia wrote in 2018 that he had "one of the most engaged followings on YouTube".

Charles refers to his fans as "sisters". He has cited Jaclyn Hill and Nikkie de Jager as his biggest influences. He has said that, for him, makeup is "a creative outlet and an art form".

In May 2021, he was sued by a former employee of his for wrongful termination. In April 2025, after influencer Kayla Malec accused her ex-boyfriend Evan Johnson of physical abuse and he pleaded guilty to domestic assault, Johnson's former friend Zach Sellers claimed in an interview with YouTuber Bee Better that Charles had been sexually involved with Johnson, invited Johnson to his home, and gave counsel to him amid the accusations. Charles claimed in a response on TikTok that he had been unaware of Johnson's alleged abusive behavior during their brief friendship, which Malec refuted, claiming that she had informed him of it soon after the couple separated.

In May 2026, in the aftermath of the Spirit Airlines liquidation, Charles posted a video on TikTok mocking Amber Vargas, a flight attendant of the defunct airline after he saw a link to a GoFundMe from her in a direct message, calling her a "lazy piece of shit" and "entitled." The video has since been deleted but caused an uproar on social media and a mass unfollowing of his accounts. He then issued an apology to the flight attendant.

=== Tati Westbrook feud ===
In 2019, Tati Westbrook, a fellow makeup artist and frequent collaborator with Charles, uploaded a 43-minute video titled "Bye Sister", accusing him of disloyalty and attempting to seduce a heterosexual man with the knowledge of the man's sexuality. YouTuber Jeffree Star and singer Zara Larsson corroborated Westbrook's claims, and Charles became the first YouTuber to lose one million subscribers in 24 hours. He uploaded an eight-minute apology video to Westbrook, which became one of the most disliked videos on YouTube before it was deleted. He posted a second 41-minute video titled "No More Lies" addressing and refuting the comments made by Westbrook, which led to renewed online support for Charles and criticism of Westbrook. Westbrook later removed the original video and, in 2020, posted a follow-up video in which she stated that Star and Shane Dawson manipulated her into making the original video. This series of events sparked media analysis relating to cancel culture, allegations of toxicity against YouTube's beauty community, stereotypes of gay men as predatory, and the profits made from online feuds.

=== Underage sexting allegations ===
In February 2021, a 16-year-old boy named Isaiyah posted a video to TikTok alleging that Charles groomed him by sending him nude photos and pressuring him into sexting with him despite knowing his age. Charles responded to the video with a tweet denying the accusation of grooming, stating that the boy had claimed to be 18 years old. In March 2021, other underaged boys accused Charles of sending unsolicited nude photos and pressuring them into sexting with him. In April 2021, Charles posted a 14-minute-long video titled "Holding Myself Accountable", in which he stated that he sent sexually explicit messages to "two different people, both under the age of 18" who, according to him, had each told him that they were 18 years old. Charles called his past behavior "reckless" and "desperate", stating, "to the guys involved in the situation, I wanna say I'm sorry. I'm sorry that I flirted with you and I'm really sorry if I ever made you uncomfortable. It is completely unacceptable".

Later that month, Morphe released a statement saying they would cut business ties with Charles, and YouTube temporarily demonetized his channel. He returned to YouTube with a video titled An Open Conversation in July 2021. In a July 2023 interview with Cosmopolitan, Charles denied the allegations of grooming, saying that screenshots from several accusers that went viral on social media were faked. He also stated that his brother had not spoken to him since the allegations were made and that he had contemplated suicide because of them. One of the initial underage accusers told Cosmopolitan that he had falsely told Charles he was 18 years old at the time and had privately apologized to Charles for his accusations.

== Personal life ==
Charles came out as gay to his parents at age 12. Addressing questions about his gender identity, he stated, "I'm confident in myself and my gender identity – [I'm] happy being a boy. But at the same time, I love makeup. I have a full set of nails on all the time." As of 2019, his net worth was estimated to be US$12 million. In 2020, he purchased a US$7 million mansion in Los Angeles.

== Filmography ==
Television roles
Year	Title	Role	Notes	Ref.
2018	Alone Together	Jasper	Episode: "Pop-Up"	

Web roles
Year	Title	Role	Notes	Ref.
2018	The Secret World of Jeffree Star	Himself	Episode: "Becoming Jeffree Star for a Day"	
2020	Nikita Unfiltered	Himself	Episode: "James Charles Confronts Nikita"	
2020	Instant Influencer	Judge	Presenter and judge; season 1	

== Discography ==
All credits adapted from Spotify and Apple Music.

=== As lead artist ===
==== Singles ====
Year	Title
2024	"Call Me Back"
2024	"Can We Just Be Friends"
2024	"Bring Me Water"
2024	"Used to Love Me"
2025	"He Loves Me Not"

=== Music videos ===
Year	Artist	Title	Director
2019	Iggy Azalea	"Sally Walker"	Colin Tilley
2024	James Charles	"Can We Just Be Friends"	James Charles and Strø Galang To
2025	James Charles	"He Loves Me Not"	No director credited

== Awards and nominations ==
Award	Year	Category	Work	Result	Ref.
Kids' Choice Awards	2021	Favorite Male Social Star	Himself	Won	
People's Choice Awards	2018	Beauty Influencer	Himself	Won	
People's Choice Awards	2019	Beauty Influencer	Himself	Nominated	
People's Choice Awards	2020	Beauty Influencer	Himself	Won	
Shorty Awards	2017	Breakout YouTuber	Himself	Won	
Shorty Awards	2019	YouTuber of the Year	Himself	Nominated	
Streamy Awards	2018	Beauty	Himself	Won	
Streamy Awards	2019	Beauty	Himself	Nominated	
Streamy Awards	2020	Beauty	Himself	Won	
Streamy Awards	2020	Creator of the Year	Himself	Nominated	
Streamy Awards	2020	Show of the Year	Instant Influencer	Won	
Streamy Awards	2020	Unscripted Series	Instant Influencer	Nominated	
Streamy Awards	2020	Branded Content: Video	"James Charles Spills the Tea on His Glow"	Nominated	
Teen Choice Awards	2018	Choice Fashion/Beauty Web Star	Himself	Won	
Teen Choice Awards	2019	Choice Fashion/Beauty Web Star	Himself	Nominated	
