= Independent Label Group =

American record label owned by Warner Music Group

- Type: Public
- Industry: record label
- Founded: 2006
- Headquarters: Beverly Hills, California, United States
- Owner: Warner Music Group
- Parent: Warner Music Group

Independent Label Group was an American record label owned by Warner Music Group. The company was formed in 2006 as an umbrella for various Warner auxiliary labels including East West Records, Rykodisc, and Cordless Recordings. Outside the United States the label was distributed by WEA International. In 2012 it was merged into Alternative Distribution Alliance (ADA), another WMG label. It was established by Roger Gold as a way to partner with independent music labels.
