= Tati Westbrook =

American YouTuber and make-up artist (born 1982)

- Born: Tatiana Aleksandra Krievins; February 14, 1982 (age 44); Seattle, Washington, U.S.
- Other name: GlamLifeGuru
- Occupations: Makeup artist; YouTuber
- Years active: 2010–present
- Spouse: James Westbrook (m. 2017)

YouTube information
- Channel: Tati
- Subscribers: 7.92 million
- Views: 1.56 billion
- Last updated: 14/02/2026
- Website: halobeauty.com

Tatiana Aleksandra Westbrook (born Tatiana Aleksandra Krievins; February 14, 1982), best known under her vlogger name Tati, is an American YouTuber and makeup artist.

== Career ==
=== YouTube ===
Westbrook, a former image consultant turned makeup artist, created her YouTube channel GlamLifeGuru, later renamed Tati, on November 7, 2010. When she started, she knew little about cameras and editing. "At first, when I sat down to edit, it would be a twelve-hour process," she recalled in 2015, "Beauty tutorials still take a long time, but I've been able to get this down to three hours."

According to Newsweek, she is "widely considered to be a progenitor of YouTube’s beauty scene" and "the mother of the YouTube beauty community." She reached the one-million subscriber milestone in early 2016. Westbrook primarily focuses on makeup and beauty reviews, tips, and tutorials.

==== Dispute with James Charles ====
On April 22, 2019, Westbrook posted an Instagram story in which she discussed feeling betrayed by the beauty community. A few hours prior to her post, fellow beauty YouTuber James Charles posted an advertisement for SugarBearHair, a competitor to Westbrook's company Halo Beauty. On May 10, 2019, Westbrook posted a 43-minute YouTube video titled Bye Sister... in which she claimed the feud between her and Charles was not only about advertising but also about her history with Charles and allegations that he preyed on heterosexual men. She gained more than four million subscribers in a week as a result of the video, and Charles lost more than three million subscribers in four days. She reached a peak following of over 10.6 million subscribers. Charles responded to the claims on May 18 with a video titled No More Lies in which he shared his side of the story. Westbrook subsequently lost over a million subscribers, as well as eligibility for YouTube's Diamond Creator Award.

On June 30, 2020, Westbrook posted a video on her YouTube channel titled Breaking My Silence..., detailing the events that led up to, and occurred after her Bye Sister... video, in which she claimed Shane Dawson and Jeffree Star manipulated her into making the video against Charles. The video has been set to private as of June 2021.

=== Tati Beauty ===
In October 2019, she launched a cosmetic line named Tati Beauty, with her first product being a textured neutrals eye shadow palette. In November 2021, Westbrook announced that Tati Beauty was closing in an almost nine-minute video titled "Why I'm Closing Tati Beauty", citing the COVID-19 pandemic and legal troubles.

=== Halo Beauty ===
In February 2018, Westbrook co-founded and launched her own company, Halo Beauty Inc., which sells vitamin supplements. In 2019, Westbrook was making an estimated $1.3 million a year from YouTube and her company. In October 2020, Westbrook and her husband, James, were sued by former business partner and co-founder of Halo Beauty, Clark Swanson, for breach of contract, gross negligence and fraudulent inducement relating to Westbrook's vitamin line, Halo Beauty. In July 2024, the lawsuit settled out of court with Westbrook announcing on YouTube that she was leaving Halo Beauty.

=== Unfair Advantage ===
In May 2026, Westbrook launched Unfair Advantage, a functional beverage brand, with its first product, Go Go Juice, a powdered energy drink.

== Personal life ==
Tati is of Latvian ancestry. In 2017, she married James Westbrook, who regularly appears in her YouTube videos. Through this marriage, she has a stepson who occasionally appears in her videos. In June 2021, Tati resumed her YouTube presence through a video entitled "A Year Later…," announcing her intention to revisit her original content format by creating makeup tutorials and reviews. This decision followed approximately a year-long hiatus from YouTube after an apology video to fellow YouTuber James Charles, which had since been removed. Notably, the video reaffirmed Tati's ongoing leadership role as the CEO of Halo Beauty amidst ongoing litigation.
