= 9th Shorty Awards =

Awards show for short-form social web media content

9th Annual Shorty Awards
- Date: April 23, 2017
- Location: The Times Center, New York City
- Hosted by: Tony Hale

The 9th Annual Shorty Awards, honoring the best in social media, took place on April 23, 2017, at The Times Center, New York City. The ceremony was hosted by actor and comedian Tony Hale. There was a musical performance by Lizzo.

== Influencer winners and nominees ==
Nominations were announced on January 17, 2017, with public voting closing on February 16, 2017. Finalists were announced on March 2, 2017. Winners are listed first and in boldface.

=== Arts & Entertainment ===
**Best Actor**: **Gaten Matarazzo**; Aziz Ansari; Channing Tatum; Cole Sprouse; Jesse Tyler Ferguson; Ryan Reynolds	**Best Actress**: **Shay Mitchell**; Brie Larson; Gina Rodriguez; Kristen Bell; Skai Jackson; Viola Davis
**Best Celebrity**: **Chrissy Teigen**; Cher; Kylie Jenner; Lady Gaga; Lin-Manuel Miranda; Oprah	**Best Comedian**: **Elijah Daniel & Christine Sydelko**; Chelsea Peretti; Leslie Jones; Samantha Bee; Sarah Silverman; The Lonely Island
**Best in Dance**: **1Million Dance Studio**; Maddie Ziegler; Matt Steffanina; Taylor Hatala; tWitch; Willdabeast Adams	**Best in Music**: **BTS**; Ariana Grande; Chance the Rapper; Ingrid Michaelson; Solange; Tegan and Sara
**Best TV Show**: **Orange Is the New Black**; Game of Thrones; Gilmore Girls; Mr. Robot; Stranger Things; Teen Wolf

=== Content ===
**Emoji of the Year**: **Middle Finger 🖕**; Black Heart 🖤; Eye Roll 🙄; The Hugger 🤗; The Thinker 🤔; Upside-Down Smiley 🙃	**GIF of the Year**: **Mr. Peanut's Dab**; Crying Jordan; I Have Arrived; Kermit vs. Kermit; Obama's Mic Drop; Well Yikes
**Instagram of the Year**: **Same But Different**; VisibleMe; Beyoncé and Blue; Happy Place; That Kim Photo; You're the Spark	**Tumblr Blog of the Year**: **The Blackout**; Bryan Daugherty; Google Dog View; OMG Check Please; Old Doritos Bags in Movies; Words N Quotes
**Vine of the Year**: **The Laughing Fox**; Hemtube's Household Chores; Still SpongeBob AF; When You Find Your Soulmate; When You're the Main Character Tho; You Make My Dreams Come Tru

=== Creative & Media ===
**Animal**: **Crusoe the Celebrity Dachshund**; Aaron's Animals; Geordi La Corgi; Harlow and Sage; Lionel the Hedgehog; Jiffpom; Old Friends Senior Dog Sanctuary	**Art**: **Timmy Ham**; Geronimo Balloons; Hari & Deepti; Jessica Walsh; Shawna X; Tuesday Bassen
**Author**: **Mara Wilson**; Chuck Klosterman; Jennifer Weiner; Maureen Johnson; Roxane Gay; Stephen King	**Fashion**: **Winnie Harlow**; Bryan Yambao; Danielle Bernstein; Julie Sariñana; Margaret Zhang; Olivier Rousteing
**Food**: **Tasty**; Brothers Green; Olga Noskova; SweetAmbs; The Domestic Geek; Wright Kitchen	**Health & Wellness**: **Dana Falsetti**; Black Girl In Om; Hannah Bronfman; Hello Glow; Patrick Beach; The Body Coach TV
**House & Home**: **Mr. Kate**; Design Milk; Drew & Jonathan Scott – Property Brothers; Fredrik Eklund; The House That Lars Built; The Jungalow	**Instagrammer of the Year**: **Doug the Pug**; Celebs on Sandwiches; Desirée De León; Paulo del Valle; Stephen McMennamy; Vickie Liu
**Journalist**: **Lauren Duca**; Al Roker; Andrew Kaczynski; Jacqui Cheng; Jorge Ramos; Tre'well Anderson	**Lifestyle**: **Kyle Krieger**; Amber Fillerup Clark; Amelia Liana; Christina Brown; Jeanne Grey; The Anna Edit
**Meme/Parody Account**: **Girl With No Job**; @FibonacciSpiral; Kirby Jenner; Taste of Streep; Versace Tamagotchi; Your Shitty Family	**Parenting**: **Nev Schulman & Laura Perlongo**; Harlem; Eh Bee Family; James Breakwell; Life of Dad; That Happy Family
**Sports**: **Simone Biles**; Cam Newton; Ibtihaj Muhammad; Indi Cowie; Michael Phelps; Richard Jefferson

=== Team Internet ===
**Breakout YouTuber**: **James Charles**; Alexis G. Zall; Bretman Rock; Evelyn from the Internets; Mikey Murphy; Ozzy Man Reviews	**Muser of the Year**: **Jacob Sartorius**; Dani and Deven (Perkins Sisters); Baby Ariel; Lisa and Lena; Loren Gray; Max and Harvey
**Snapchatter of the Year**: **Atlas Acopian**; Lauren Giraldo; Mike Platco; OperAmericano; Rasmus Kolbe; Women In Tech	**Viner of the Year**: **Aaron Chewning**; Kenny Knox; Manon Mathews; Matt Post; Sarah Schauer; chloe lmao
**YouNower of the Year**: **Absofcourse**; Diegosaurs; Evie Yannakidis; Joel and Monica; Zach Clayton; itssnowhimself	**YouTube Comedian**: **Andrew Lowe**; Drew Monson; Jessi Smiles; Nathan Zed; Sarah Baska; Thomas Sanders
**YouTube Ensemble**: **Jenna and Julien**; Desi Perkins & Lustrelux; Dirty 30; Carly & Erin; Just Between Us; Matt Steffanina & D-Trix	**YouTube Guru**: **Carli Bybel**; Jackie Aina; Jaclyn Hill; Jeffree Star; KathleenLights
**YouTube Musician**: **Dodie Clark**; Andrew Huang; Meghan Tonjes; Tiffany Alvord; Todrick Hall; Trevor Moran	**YouTuber of the Year**: **Colleen Ballinger**; Gigi Gorgeous; Jenna Marbles; Lilly Singh; Liza Koshy; MKBHD

=== Tech & Innovation ===
**Activism**: **Ashley Graham**; Jazz Jennings; Jesse Williams; Leonardo DiCaprio; Shailene Woodley; Zellie Imani	**Gaming**: **Funhaus**; IHasCupquake; KYRSP33DY; Markiplier; MatPat; Yogscast Hannah
**LGBTQ+ Youtube Channel**: **Shannon Beveridge**; Bria and Chrissy; Kat Blaque; MarkE Miller; Ari Fitz; Stevie Boebi	**Periscoper of the Year**: **Darius Arya**; Bec Boop; Go2Kitchens; Ian McLaughlin; SockCop; Mawnika
**Podcast**: **Anna Faris is Unqualified**; Dan Carlin's Hardcore History; Guys We F****d; Lore; Stuff You Should Know; TED Radio Hour	**STEM**: **Bill Nye**; Adam Savage; Dr. Sandra Lee; Simone Giertz; The Tim Peake; Unbox Therapy
**Twitch Streamer of the Year**: **Annemunition**; Bob Ross; DexterityBonus; OMGitsfirefoxx; Summit1G; iijeriichoii	**Vlogger of the Year**: **David Dobrik***; Erik Conover; Julien Solomita; Louis Cole; Shaytards; The Gabbie Vlogs
**Web Series**: Camp Unplug; Foursome; Freakish; Girl on Girl with Hannah Witton; Style Code Live; The Tyler Oakley Show	**Weird**: **Hydraulic Press Channel**; Casually Explained; Bread Face Channel; The Food Surgeon; You Are Dog Now; You Suck at Cooking
