= ConFusion =

Science fiction convention in Michigan, US

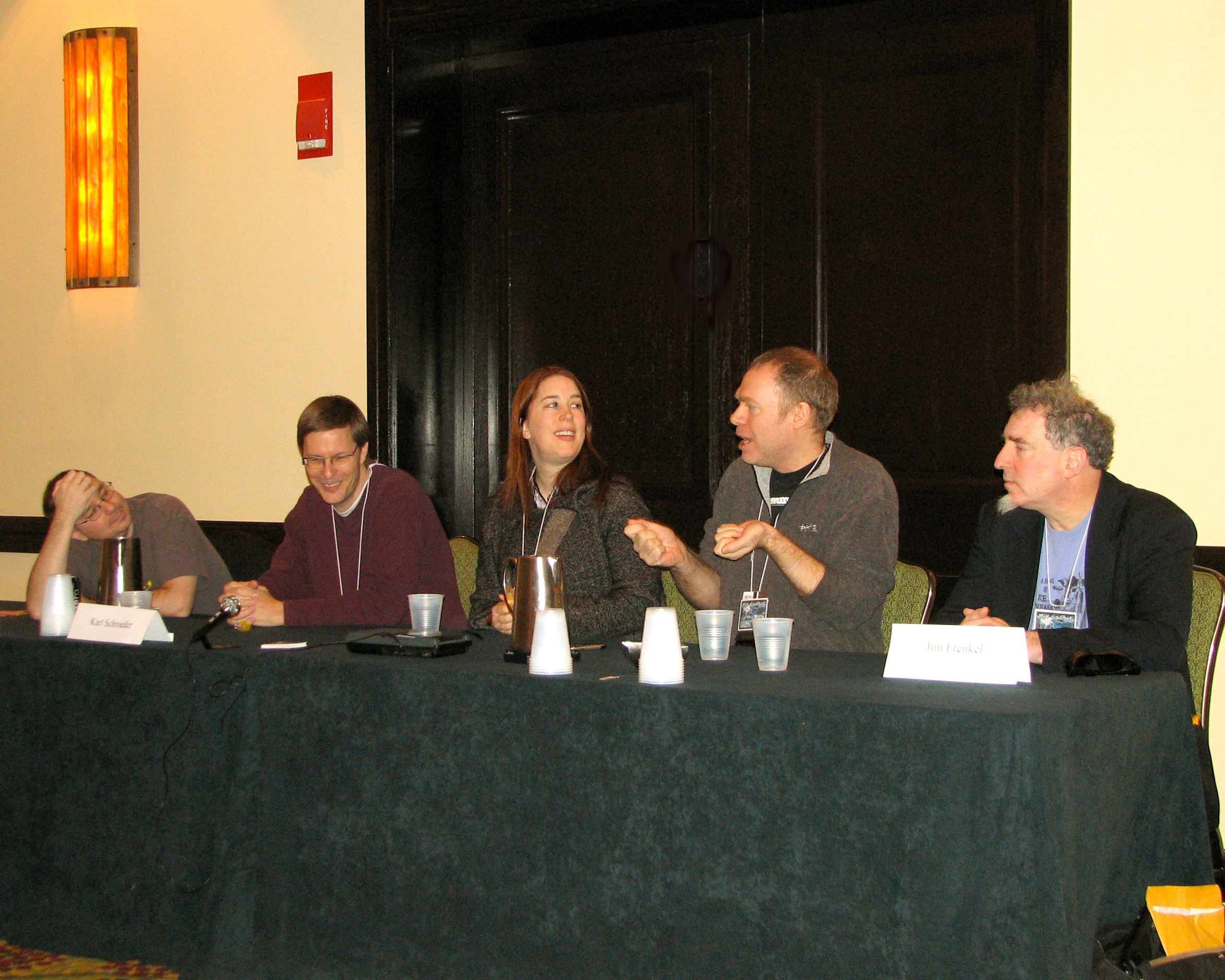
- Left to right: John Scalzi, Karl Schroeder, Justine Larbalestier, Scott Westerfeld and James Frenkel on a panel at ConFusion 2008
- Status: Active
- Genre: Science Fiction, Fantasy, Fandoms
- Venue: 2016 - Present: Novi Sheraton, Michigan; 2013–2015: Dearborn Doubletree, Michigan; 2003–2012: Troy Marriott, Michigan
- Location: Michigan
- Country: United States
- Inaugurated: 1974
- Attendance: 800–1000 attendees annually
- Organizer: Ann Arbor Science Fiction Association
- Website: confusionsf.org

ConFusion is an annual science fiction convention founded in 1974 by a University of Michigan science fiction club known as the Stilyagi Air Corps, and is currently run by the Ann Arbor Science Fiction Association, a not-for-profit group. Typically, it is held during the third weekend of January. It is one of the oldest science fiction conventions in Michigan. ConFusion is a regional, general science fiction convention similar to Windycon and Lunacon. The programming consists of panels on science fiction and fantasy, literature, media, science, fandom, art, comics, music, costuming, etc. with discussions by authors, scientists, fans, and artists. There is a large music track, board games and roleplaying games, KidFusion — a track of programming specifically for kids —and a masquerade or costume contest.

ConFusion has a consuite, as well as room parties hosted by other conventions, WorldCon bids, and local clubs.

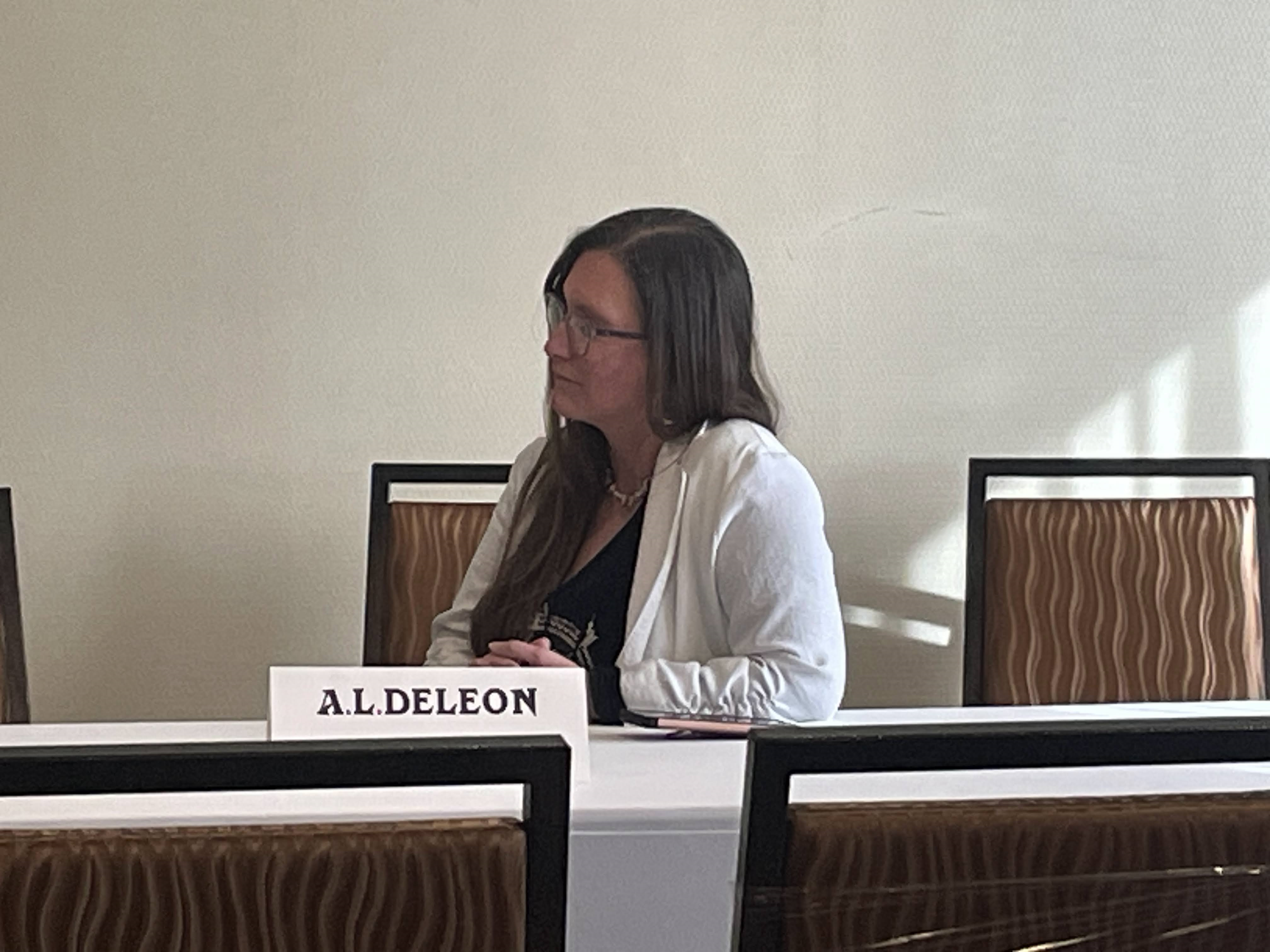
Author A. L. DeLeon in 2024

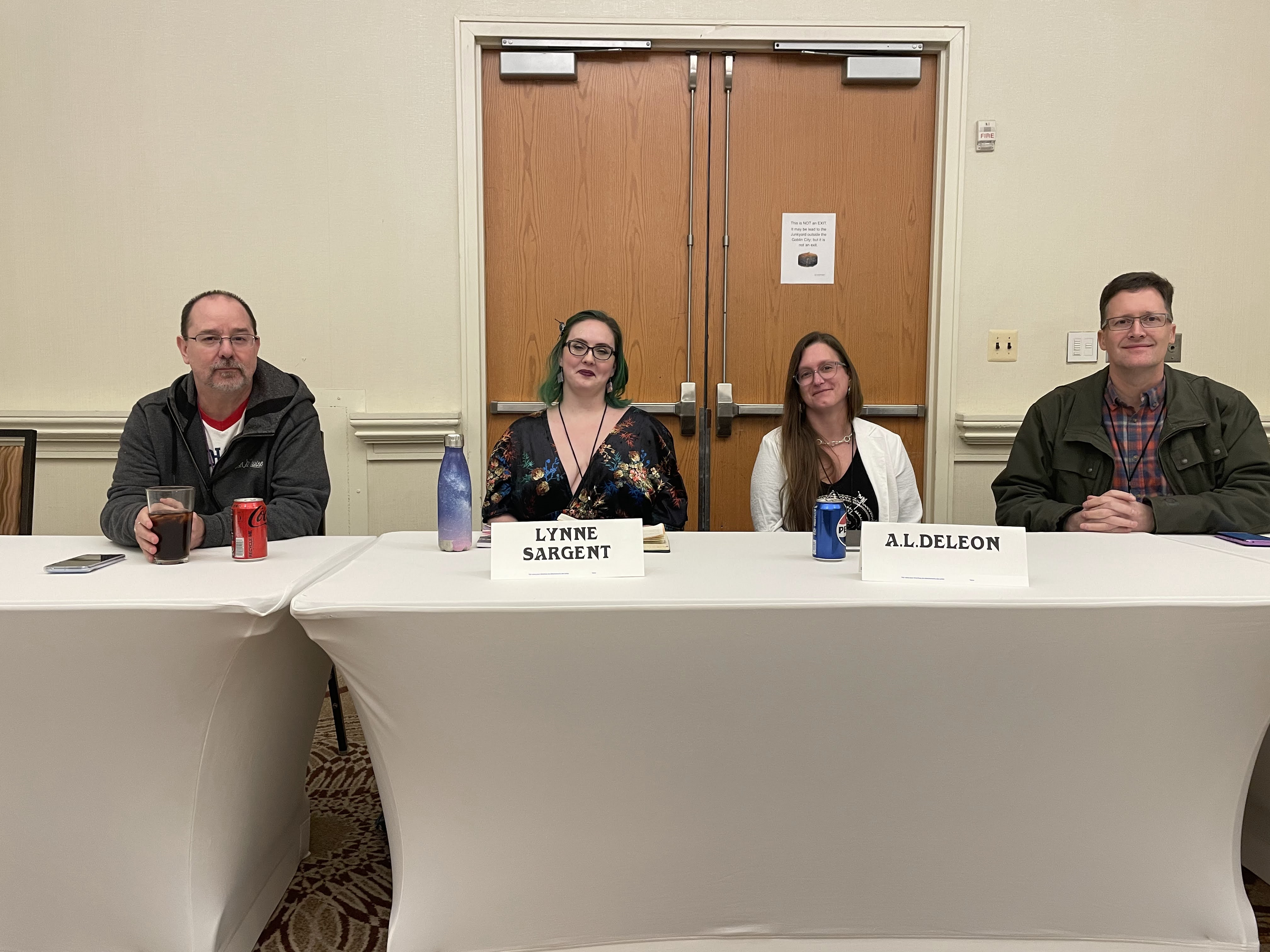
AI Panel from left to right: John Scalzi, Lynne Sargent, A. L. DeLeon, Jason Sanford in 2024

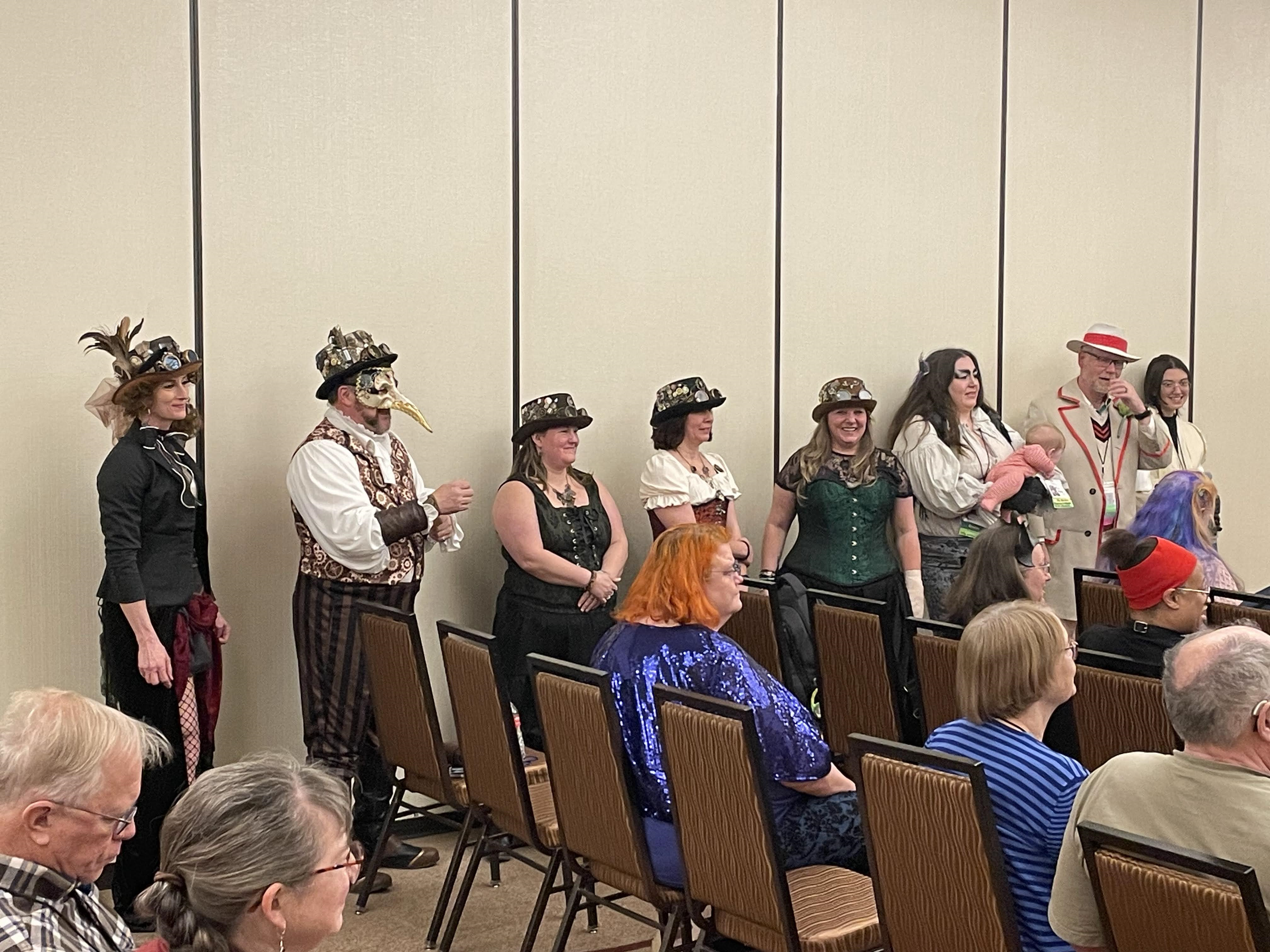
Masquerade in 2024

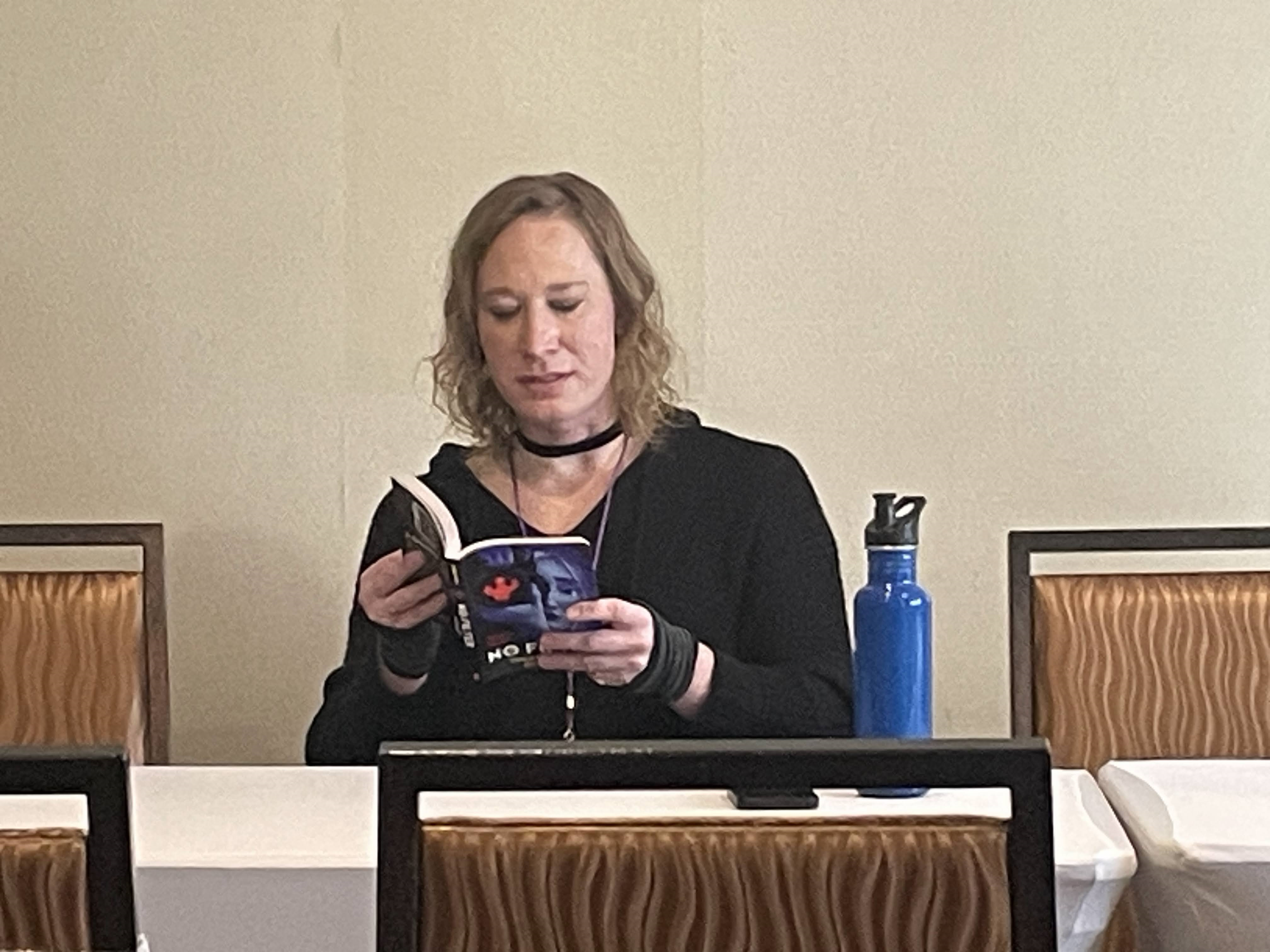
Author Kelley Skovron in 2024

== History ==
The Ann Arbor Relax-i-con was founded in 1974. Based on its success, the Stilyagi Air Corps named the new convention Condom as a takeoff of the word fandom. The chairman, Ro Nagey, was absent for the meeting about the name change and convinced them to use the name ConFusion instead. The name turned out to be prophetic as the first science Guest of Honor was the owner of local technology spin-off company KMS Fusion.

Because the first convention run by the organization was not actually named ConFusion, they are generally counted starting with ConFusion 13 in 1975 or with the A Squared Relax-I-Con (one of many intentionally confusing names voted on by the membership). The 1980 convention was aptly named Confusion 6 &/or 7, and ConFusion XXX in 2004 could be considered the 30th convention of that name, or 31st Stilyagi convention.

The Stilyagi Air Corps, named after a group in Robert A. Heinlein's The Moon is a Harsh Mistress, is a loose, informal group. Lifetime membership is free for anyone interested in science fiction who attends a single Stilyagi party, meeting, or event. The sponsoring organization, AASFA, is a Michigan nonprofit corporation board elected from Stilyagi who have volunteered to work on running ConFusion.

== 2024 Event ==
The 2024 event, titled Labyrinth of ConFusion was held on January 19 - 21 at the Novi Sheraton in Michigan. The notable panelists included Mark Oshiro, Kurt Erichsen BluRaven C. Houvener. Authors included Kelley Skovron, A. L. DeLeon, Marie Vibbert and Jordan Kurella.

Events included authors and experts in fields such as Dungeons and Dragons, neurodiversity, climate change, and NASA's plans to visit asteroids. A panel on Artificial intelligence was held. There was a screening of a Sci-fi fan created film from 1978 called FAANs. Many authors participated in book readings and book signings. Masquerade (pictured to the right) is always a popular event with judges naming the top three winners in each category. A flash fiction session was held where authors created short fiction stories in a limited time span, ranging from 15 minutes to an hour.

Steph C. was the Young Adult Guest of Honor.

== 2023 Event ==
The 2023 event titled Avatar: The Legend of ConFusion featured authors and speakers Chris Barkley, Kathe Koja, Jacob Pauwels, and Kat Malokofsky.

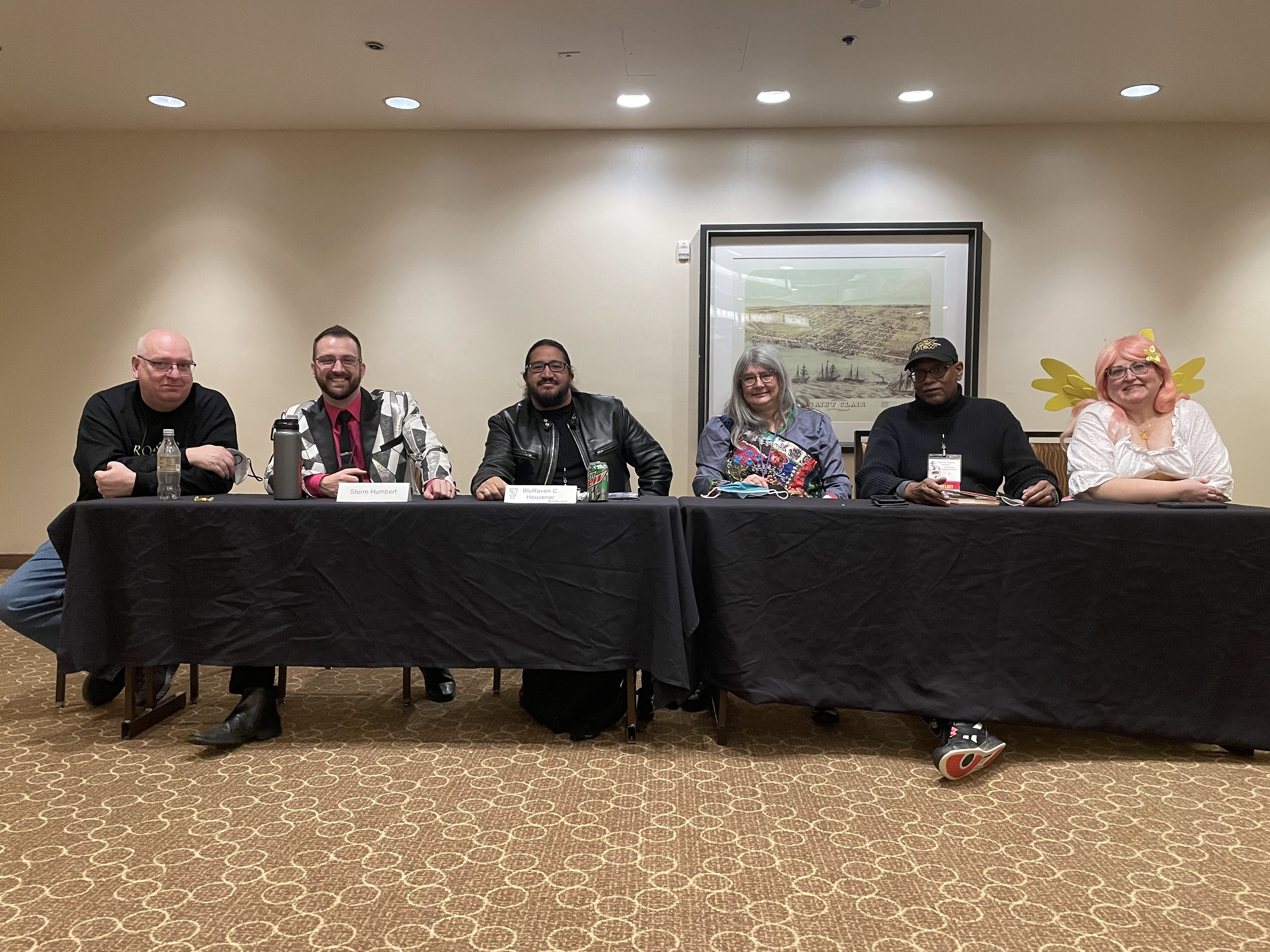
ConFusion Panel 2023

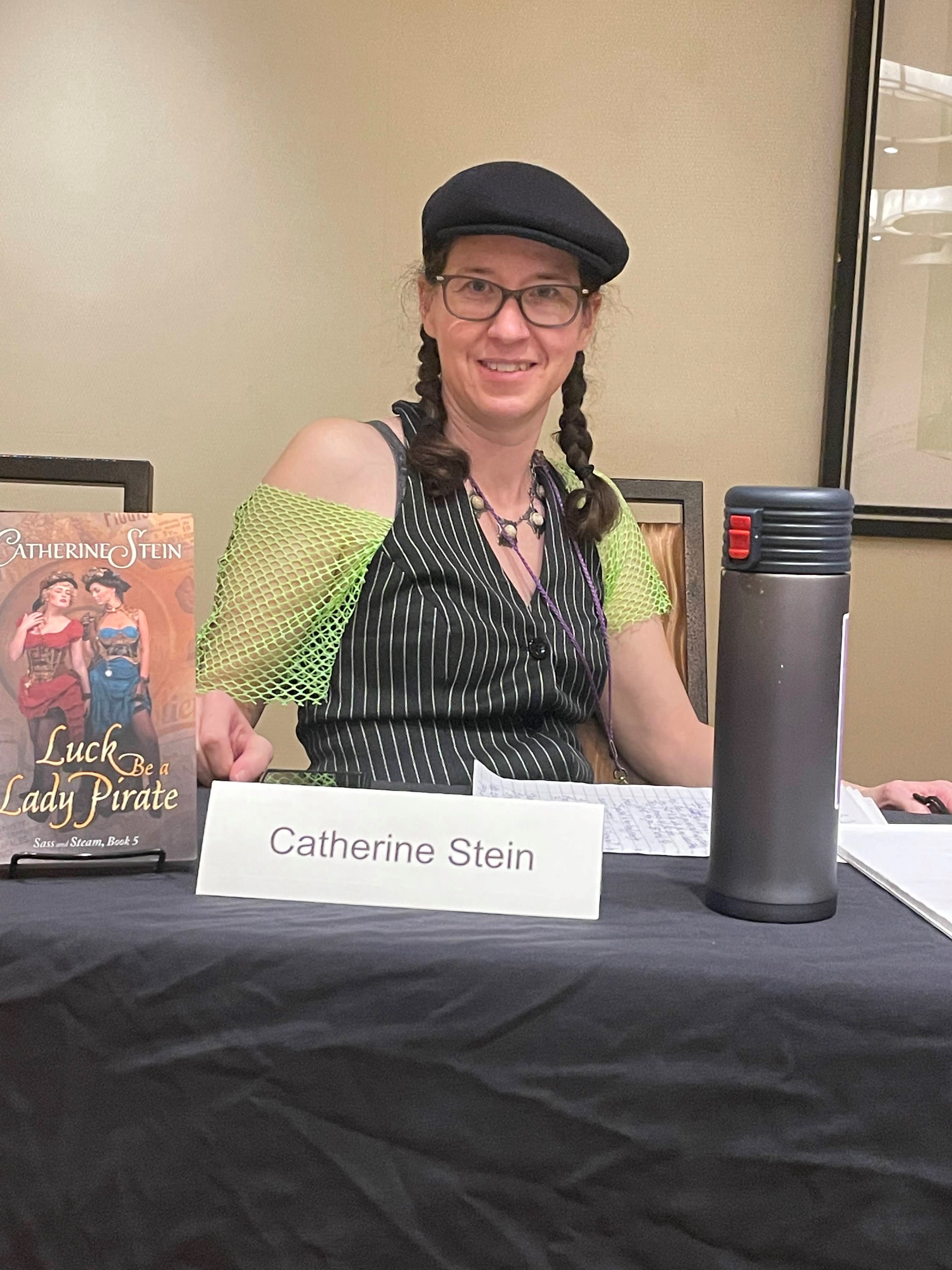
Catherine Stein

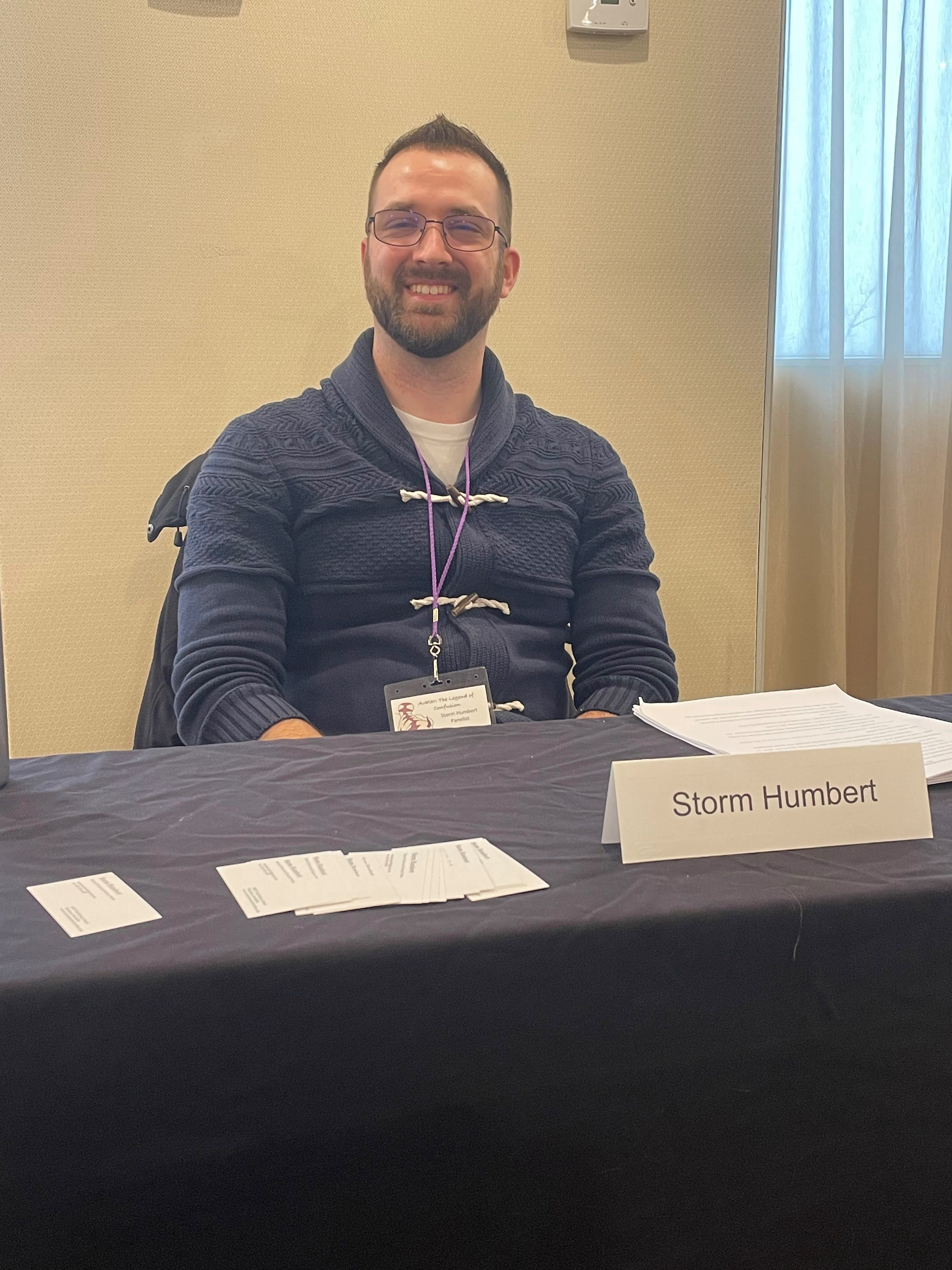
Storm Humbert

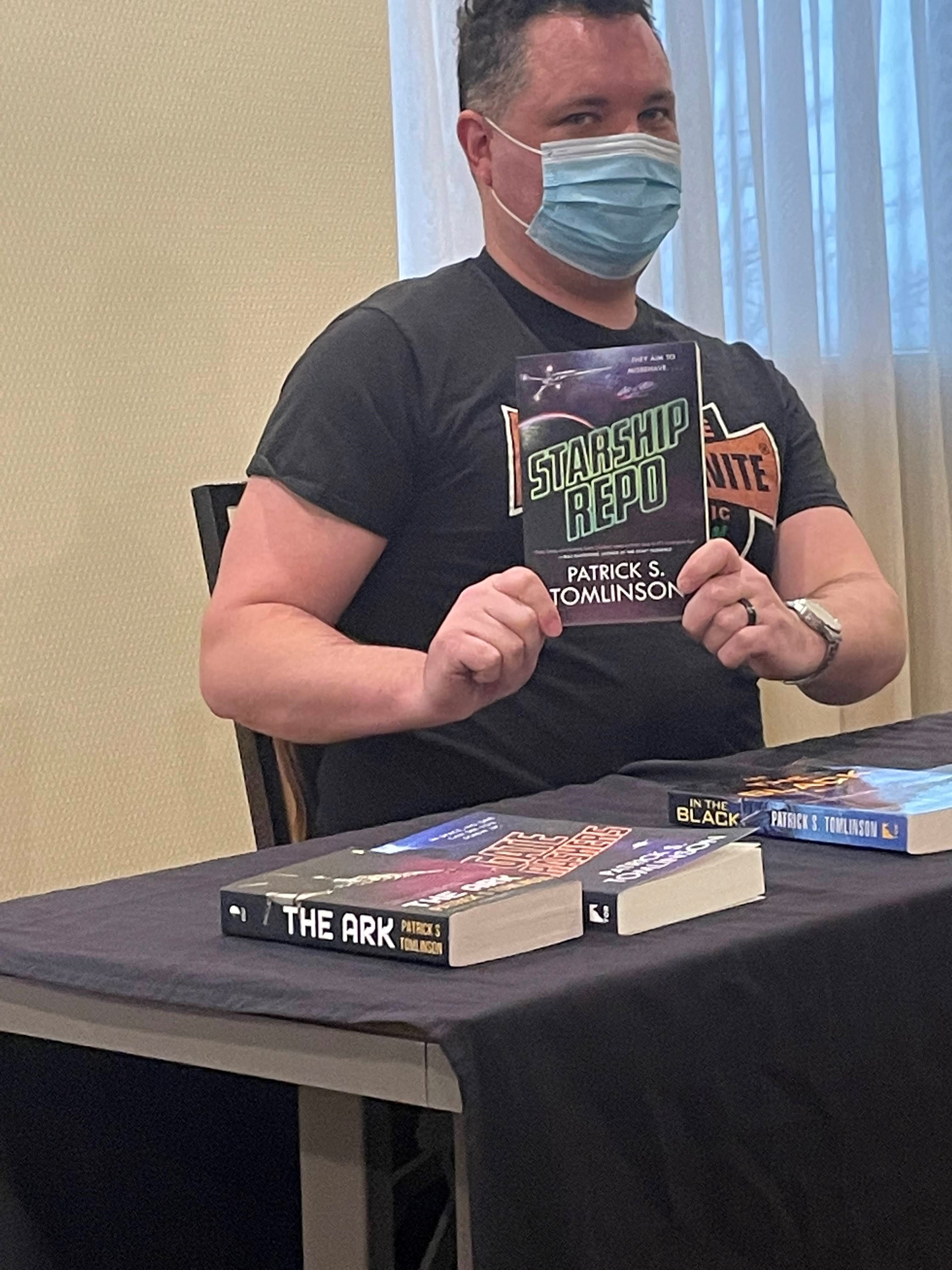
Patrick Tomlinson

== Years of ConFusion ==
ConFusion has been active from 1974 until present. The table below lists the year, name and Guests of Honor (GOHs) for each convention.

Year	Name	Pro	Fan	Artist	Scientist	Wild Card	Special Guest	Chair
1974	A2 Relax-I-Con	Lloyd Biggle Jr.	Howard DeVore					Ro Nagey
1975	ConFusion 13	Frederik Pohl	Mike Glicksohn				Jim Martin (Toastmaster)	Ro Nagey
1976	ConFusion 12	Lloyd Biggle Jr.	Bill Bowers				Jim Martin (Toastmaster)	Ro Nagey
1977	ConFusion 14	Poul Anderson	Ro Nagey				Jim Martin (Toastmaster)	Zita Kutkus Larry Ward
1978	ConFusion π	Kate Wilhelm	Jackie Causgrove				Jim Martin (Toastmaster)	Larry Tucker
1979	E/c2 ConFusion (Mass ConFusion)	Spider Robinson Jeanne Robinson	Scott Imes				Ro Nagey (Toastmaster)	Dave Innes Larry Tucker
1980	ConFusion 6 and/or 7	Stanley Schmidt	Elliott Shorter				Rusty Hevelin (Toastmaster)	Dave Innes Larry Tucker
1981	Nine Billion Names of ConFusion	Barry B. Longyear	Dave Innes				Gay Haldeman (Toastmaster)	Nancy Tucker
1982	ConFusion 11	Phyllis Eisenstein	Neil Rest				Larry Tucker (Toastmaster)	Nancy Tucker
1983	ConFusion 101	C. J. Cherryh	Bill Cavin				Ted Reynolds (Toastmaster)	Tara Edwards
1984	Genuine ConFusion	Mike Resnick	Martha Beck				Dick Smith (Toastmaster)	Nancy Tucker
1985	Decadent ConFusion	Alan Dean Foster	Julia Ecklar				Marty Burke (Toastmaster)	Michelle Smith-Moore
1986	Perpetual ConFusion	Somtow Sucharitkul	Bill Roper	Frank Kelly Freas			Robert Asprin (Toastmaster)	Tom Barber
1987	Stark Raving ConFusion	Katherine Kurtz	Elizabeth 'Liz' Pearce	Erin McKee			Marty Burke (Toastmaster)	Nancy Farmer
1988	Ambulatory ConFusion	Joe Haldeman	Larry Tucker	David Cherry			Marta Randall (Toastmaster)	Nancy Farmer
1989	ConFusion 102	Barbara Hambly	Ted Reynolds	Linda Michaels			Bob Passavoy (Toastmaster)	Tara Barber
1990	State of ConFusion	Hal Clement	Michelle Smith-Moore Garth Barbour	Kevin Davies			Michael P. Kube-McDowell (Toastmaster)	Erik Kauppi
1991	Immaculate ConFusion	Esther Friesner	Somtow Sucharitkul	Robin Wood			Wendy Counsil (Toastmaster)	Erik Kauppi
1992	Hardwired ConFusion	Walter Jon Williams	Rusty Hevelin	Rick Lieder				Gay Haldeman (Toastmaster) Roberta Kennedy John Woudstra
1993	Transcendental ConFusion	Fred Saberhagen	Pat Sims Roger Sims	Randy Asplund			Jodie Offutt (Toastmaster)	Greg Cronau
1994	ConFusion XX	Joan D. Vinge	Leah Zeldes Smith	Erin McKee				Andrew J. Offutt (Toastmaster) Barb Daoust Carolyn Westbrook Jeff Westbrook
1995	ConFusion 10101	Pamela Sargent	Wilson "Bob" Tucker	Laura Butler	Geoffrey A. Landis			Kathe Koja (Toastmaster) Karen Roe Dennis Tabaczewski
1996	Deviant ConFusion	Tim Powers	Melody Faith	Bob Eggleton	Geoffrey A. Landis			Michael P. Kube-McDowell (Toastmaster) Barb Daoust Jeff Westbrook
1997	ConFusion-17	Samuel R. Delany	Joey Shoji	Susan Van Camp	Mark Shappirio		Kathe Koja (Toastmaster)	Katherine Becker
1998	ConFusion of the Winnebagos	Connie Willis	Mary Ellen Wessels	Jane Irwin	Marvin Minsky			Larry Tucker (Toastmaster) Katherine Becker Dennis Tabaczewski
1999	Vintage ConFusion	Lois McMaster Bujold	Nancy Tucker Shaw	Douglas Chaffee	Carl Djerassi		Howard DeVore (Toastmaster)	Katherine Becker
2000	ConFusion 19100	Maureen F. McHugh	Dennis Tabaczewski	Frank Hayes	Eric S. Raymond		Erik Kauppi (Toastmaster)	Tracy Worcester
2001	Mystery God ConFusion	Sarah Zettel	Tom Barber	Carla Speed McNeil	Bruce Schneier		Katherine Becker (Toastmaster)	Tammy Coxen
2002	Astronomical ConFusion	George R. R. Martin	Heather Alexander	Pete Abrams	Br. Guy Consolmagno		Sharon Myers Shaw (Toastmaster)	Tammy Coxen
2003	ConFusion and Her Friends	Melissa Scott	Roberta Kennedy	Alan M. Clark	Jack Cohen			Tammy Coxen
2004	ConFusion XXX	Bruce Sterling	Geri Sullivan	Julie Bell	Ron Westrum	Rob Sawyer (Toastmaster)		Anne Gray
2005	31 Flavors of ConFusion	Emma Bull Will Shetterly	David G. Hartwell Kathryn Cramer	Derek Grime	Christian Ready	Steven Brust (Toastmaster) Steven Brust (Toastmaster)		Anne Gray
2006	Synthetic ConFusion	Vernor Vinge	Chuck Firment	Steven Stiles	Mitchell Burnside Clapp		Alexander James Adams (Toastmaster)	Krysta December
2007	MoonBase ConFusion	Elizabeth Moon	Bill Higgins	Steve MacDonald	Paul "PZ" Myers		Howard Waldrop (Toastmaster)	Roxanne King
2008	High-Voltage ConFusion	Justine Larbalestier Scott Westerfeld	The Roving Pirate Party	Carl Lundgren	Kevin M. Dunn	Throwing Toasters (Music GoH)	John Scalzi (Toastmaster)	Brendan Durrett
2009	Cryptic ConFusion	Cat Rambo	Freon Michael Andaluz	Diana Harlan Stein	Elizabeth Turtle Ralph D. Lorenz	Cory Doctorow (Cryptic GoH)	Davroz (David Rozian) (Toastmaster)	Anne Gray
2010	I See By My ConFusion	Peter S. Beagle Catherynne Valente	David Gibbs	Matt Busch	Steve Collins	S. J. Tucker (Filk GoH)	Robert R. McCammon	Jessica Zerwas
2011	This ConFusion Is Not Yet Rated	Cherie Priest	Lisa Garrison		Aubrey de Grey	Paolo Bacigalupi (Pro GoH)	Peter V. Brett	Brian Decker
2012	Epic ConFusion	Patrick Rothfuss	Tom Smith		Harley Thronson	Roxanne Meida King (Special Fan GoH)	Peter V. Brett Joe Abercrombie Brent Weeks Robin Hobb	Brian Decker
2013	Immortal ConFusion	Charles Stross	James Davis Nicoll	Scott Edelman (Editor GoH)	Jennifer Ouellette	Mary Robinette Kowal (Special GoH)	Alastair Reynolds Kat Howard Maria Dahvana Headley	Lucy Kennedy
2014	Legendary ConFusion	Mike Carey	Mark Bernstien	Rich Morris	Ian Tregillis	Adam Matianazzi (S2 Games)	Jacqueline Carey	Ryan Carey
2015	Back to the ConFusion	Karen Lord	Aaron Thul	Heather Dale (Music GoH)	Cynthia Chestek	Monte Cook Shanna Germain (Gaming GoHs)	Steven Erikson Ted Chiang Joe Abercrombie	Dave Klecha
2016	Life, the Universe, and ConFusion	Alaya Dawn Johnson	Jessica Drummer	Gordon Smith (Media GoH)	Kentaro Toyama		Ann Leckie Kelley Armstrong Cameron McClure	Anna Carey
2017	Friendship is ConFusion	Gail Carriger	Mark Oshiro	Jeffrey Alan Love	Karen Burnham	Mallory O'Meara (Media GoH)	James S. A. Corey Joe Hill Gillian Redfern	Anna Carey
2018	ConFusion Through the Looking Glass	Kate Elliott	Nisi Shawl	Luke Ski (Comedy GoH)	Annalee Newitz	James Breakwell (Media GoH)	Jim Butcher Gail Cross	Amy Sexsmith
2019	Storming the Confusion	Ada Palmer	David Stein		Dr. Jennifer Piatek		Joe Lansdale Lewis Shiner	Amy Sexsmith
2020	How to Train Your ConFusion	Kameron Hurley	Bogi Takacs	Brandon O'Brien (Creative GoH)	Dr. Julie Lesnik		Seanan McGuire Gwenda Bond	Lithie Dubois
2021	Event cancelled due to COVID-19 pandemic							
2022	Rising Confusion	Jim C. Hines	Anna Carey	Rachel Quinlan (Artist)	Dr. Jordan Steckloff	Doselle Young (Comics/Creative Arts)		Lithie Dubois
2023	Avatar: The Legend of ConFusion		Chris Barkley	Kathe Koja (Creative)		Jacob Pauwels (Media)		Kat Malokofsky
2024	Labyrinth of ConFusion	Mark Oshiro	Kurt Erichsen	BluRaven C. Houvener			Steph C (Young Adult Guest of Honor)	Chelle Green
2025	Monumental ConFusion	Stephen Leigh	Brian Decker			AASFA Board		
2026	Magical ConFusion	Maurice Broaddus	Andrea Phillips	Megan Leigh	Sarah Goslee			Yanni Kuznia
2027	The Order of the Purple ConFusion	Arkady Martine	Jason Sanford	Patrick Chapin	Dr. Jeffrey Strom			Yanni Kuznia
Year	Name	Pro	Fan	Artist	Scientist	Wild Card	Special Guest	Chair
