= Kirby Jenner =

American performance artist

Kirby Jenner is a performance artist and internet celebrity. He rose to popularity for his Instagram account where he poses as Kendall Jenner's fraternal twin. He has received nominations for the Webby and Shorty Awards in Social Humor, Best Photography, and Parody Accounts.

== Career ==
Jenner describes himself as an "amateur model." He began his Instagram account in July 2015. By November 2016, the account had 439,000 followers. His account has 1.4 million followers as of June 2020. Newsbeat describes Jenner as a Photoshop pro for his ability to crop himself into the images of Kendall Jenner although he claimed to not know anything about Photoshop in an interview with Bored Panda.

=== Kirby Jenner on Quibi ===
In May 2020, Jenner's self-titled parody reality show premiered on Quibi. Kendall and Kris Jenner are the show's executive producers. It also features appearances from other members of the Kardashian family as well as several celebrities including Heidi Klum, Tan France, and Camille Kostek. In October 2020, Quibi shut down, and all content, including Kirby Jenner, moved to The Roku Channel.

== Filmography ==
Year	Title	Role	Notes
2020	Kirby Jenner	Self	

== Awards and nominations ==
Year	Award	Category	Result	Ref(s)
2016	Webby Award	Social- Humor	Nominated	
2017	Webby Award	Social- Best Photography & Graphics	Nominated	
2018	Shorty Awards	Meme/Parody Account	Nominated	
