= IHasCupquake =

American YouTuber (born 1988)

iHasCupquake
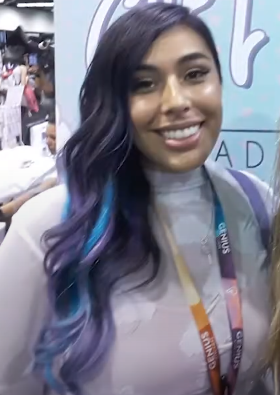
- iHasCupquake in 2018
- Born: Tiffany Michelle Garcia; March 19, 1988 (age 38); Los Angeles, California, U.S.
- Other names: Cupquake; TiffyQuake; cupquakely
- Occupations: YouTuber; Twitch streamer

TikTok information
- Page: Tiffy
- Followers: 1.5 million

Twitch information
- Channel: iHasCupquake
- Genres: Gaming; art; music
- Followers: 244K

YouTube information
- Channel: iHasCupquake
- Years active: 2010–present
- Genres: Gaming; art; baking; DIY; animation; vlogging
- Subscribers: 7.13 million
- Views: 3.11 billion
- Last updated: May 29, 2026

Tiffany Michelle "Tiffy" Herrera (née Garcia; born March 19, 1988), better known by her online alias iHasCupquake (often shortened to Cupquake), or alternatively TiffyQuake, is an American YouTuber.

She initially gained a following for her gaming videos, particularly her Minecraft Let's Plays, before expanding her content to include baking, art, and DIY videos. YouTube and online media outlets have described Herrera as one of the most prominent female gaming creators on the platform. As of May 2026, her main YouTube channel has amassed over 7.13 million subscribers and 3.11 billion video views.

== Early life and online career ==
A native of Los Angeles, Cupquake was born Tiffany Michelle Garcia on March 19, 1988. She is of a Mexican American background and grew up in East Los Angeles. She began her career as an online content creator on YouTube, registering her account in 2010. Her gaming videos, mainly centered around Minecraft, propelled her to popularity on the platform. She was one of the first successful Minecraft YouTubers. In 2012, she hosted the first Minecraft "Hunger Games" competition, on which YouTube retrospectively wrote that "many feel inspired the future battle royale video game genre".

Herrera eventually began varying her videos to include baking, art, and DIY content. Her baking videos are dubbed Quake n' Bake. She also uploaded animated videos, with the animation being produced by others. Jaiden Animations was one of Herrera's animators prior to becoming a prominent YouTuber in her own right. One of Herrera's and Jaiden's animated videos, based on Five Nights at Freddy's, ranks as one of the most-viewed indie animated shorts on the platform with over 100 million views. By 2014, Herrera's channel was signed to the multi-channel network (MCN), OmniaMediaCo. Also in 2014, Herrera had a voice role in Counter Spell, a Machinima-produced animated web series. She also hosted Best Year Ever, a web series on her channel produced by Target. The series featured Herrera and interior designer Veronica Valencia redecorating student dorm rooms. Aside from expanding her content, she also opened up secondary channels; one featured her cat and another was centered on collectable toys. She has also been featured on other Minecraft YouTubers' channels, such as on StacyPlays'.

In 2015, she was featured as part of YouTube Gaming's showcase at E3 2015. In 2016, she was one of the team captains in a real-life Warcraft capture the flag game organized by Legendary Pictures and Portal A, as part of the promotional campaign for the Warcraft film adaptation. She also appeared on video game journalist Geoff Keighley's YouTube live stream series. In 2017, Herrera was noted to be on the ecommerce platform Kit. Later in 2017, Herrera was featured in the Pokémon Go Travel video series and helped host its inaugural Global Catch Challenge. In 2019, she helped organize the MC Championship. Her channel continued to be one of the more popular Minecraft ones into 2020. In 2022, Herrera partnered with Fresh Step and FCB Chicago for a live stream cat adoption event.

== Recognition and public image ==
Herrera's popularity on YouTube, particularly in the gaming space and among female content creators, has been noted. In March 2017, she placed fifth in a Red Bull poll of the best female YouTubers. Later in the month, she received two Guinness World Record certificates for having the most subscribers and views "for a female games broadcaster on YouTube". At the time, she had over 5.4 million subscribers, as well as over 2.1 billion video views. She was also included in a list of recommended gaming YouTubers from The Daily Telegraph published the same year, with the publication calling her "[o]ne of the most successful female let's players". In 2021, Herrera was one of the few female creators mentioned in YouTube's "Culture & Trends" report about Minecraft's popularity on the platform.

== Filmography ==
=== Film ===
Year	Film	Role	Notes	Ref.
2018	Ralph Breaks the Internet	Herself	Cameo, voice role	

=== Web ===
Year	Title	Role	Notes	Ref.
2014	Counter Spell		voice role	
2014	Best Year Ever	Herself	Host; 4 episodes	
2015–2017	YouTube Rewind	Herself	Cameo; 3 episodes	

== Bibliography ==
- Herrera, Tiffany (2020). Magical World of IHasCupquake: A Coloring Adventure Through Sweets, Magic, and Gaming. iHasCupquake Creative. ISBN 978-1735635903.

== Awards and nominations ==
Year	Award ceremony/presenter	Category	Result	Ref.
2014	2014 Teen Choice Awards	Web Star: Gaming	Nominated	
2017	Guinness World Records	Most subscribers for a female games broadcaster on YouTube	Record	
2017	Guinness World Records	Most views for a female games broadcaster on YouTube	Record	
2017	9th Shorty Awards	Gaming	Nominated	
2017	7th Streamy Awards	Gaming	Nominated	
