= Midwestcon =

Science fiction convention

- Genre: Science fiction
- Locations: Cincinnati, Ohio
- Country: United States
- Website: www.cfg.org/midwestcon/

Midwestcon is a science fiction convention held annually in the Cincinnati, Ohio, area by the Cincinnati Fantasy Group.

Midwestcon is an informal type of convention known as a relaxacon which means that it has no programming. Instead, it is notable as a means for science fiction fans to get together and talk to each other without the distractions of other conventions.

== History ==
The 1949 Worldcon took place in Cincinnati, and the first Midwestcon followed in 1950, and has been held every year since, making it the second longest-running SF convention to be held in the same city, and the third oldest in the U.S.

Many figures in science fiction have attended Midwestcon, including Isaac Asimov and Arthur C. Clarke. Wilson Tucker served as the perennial toastmaster for many years. Other Midwestcon attendees have included:

- Robert Bloch
- Jack L. Chalker
- Robert Coulson
- Harlan Ellison
- Phyllis Eisenstein
- Lloyd Arthur Eshbach
- Philip José Farmer
- Randall Garrett
- Joe Haldeman
- David H. Keller
- Stephen Leigh
- George R.R. Martin
- Bea Mahaffey
- Julian May
- Andrew J. Offutt
- Alexei Panshin
- Mike Resnick
- Frank M. Robinson
- Dick Smith
- E. E. "Doc" Smith
- Ted White

Howard DeVore and Margaret Ford Keifer attended all 56 Midwestcons held from 1950 to 2005.

First Fandom was founded at the 1959 Midwestcon.
