= OMGitsfirefoxx =

Canadian Twitch streamer (born 1991)

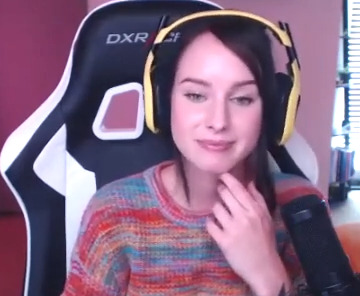
- OMGitsfirefoxx in 2020
- Born: Sonja Reid; February 12, 1991 (age 35); Toronto, Ontario, Canada
- Occupations: Twitch streamer; YouTuber

Twitch information
- Channel: OMGitsfirefoxx
- Years active: 2013–present
- Genre: Gaming
- Followers: 735 thousand
- Last updated: May 1, 2023

Sonja Reid, better known as OMGitsfirefoxx, is a Canadian Twitch streamer and podcast host. As of November 2018, she had over 631,000 followers on Twitch.

== Career ==
Reid first started streaming in 2013, while working in the retail sector. She became a partner on Twitch in January 2014, and that summer, she quit her retail job to focus entirely on streaming. By October 2015, she had become the most-followed female user on Twitch. In 2018, she hosted the SXSW Gaming Awards.

In November of 2020 she began co-hosting the gaming/humor podcast Good Game Nice Try! with Aaron Bleyaert.

== Recognition ==
Reid was named to Forbes's "30 Under 30" list in 2016. She was named "Most followed female videogames broadcaster on Twitch" in the 2017 Guinness World Records Gamer's Edition. Also in 2017, she was named the fourth most influential gamer in the world by Forbes, and was a finalist for the "Twitch Streamer of the Year" award at the 9th Shorty Awards.

== Personal life ==
As of 2013, Reid was dating fellow gamer Tucker Boner, also known as "Jericho". Reid and Boner met playing an online game together, and they have collaborated on Twitch gaming livestreams. They separated in 2017.
