= You Suck at Cooking =

Comedy cooking YouTube channel

- Title card

YouTube information
- Channel: You Suck at Cooking
- Years active: 2015–present
- Genres: Cooking show; satire; absurd comedy
- Subscribers: 3.68 million
- Views: 736 million
- Last updated: January 30, 2026
- Website: yousuckatcooking.com

You Suck at Cooking (YSAC) is an absurdist culinary YouTube channel that started in 2015. It is presented by an anonymous narrator. The channel has gained over 3 million subscribers and 700 million views.

== Overview ==
You Suck at Cooking parodies the genre of online cooking tutorial videos. The videos, set in a home kitchen, are shot on a cell phone from a first-person perspective that shows only the kitchen counter and the narrator's hands. The visual style has been described as "deliberately gritty", with lo-fi editing, poor lighting, shaky camerawork, and an "unapologetically messy" cooking environment.

The narrative style has been characterized as "chaotic but self-aware" and seemingly but not really "effortless" and "haphazard". The narrator's "wry [and] often exasperated" persona speaks with a brisk deadpan tone and repeatedly goes on absurdist riffs. The videos often feature irreverent skits; simple, quirky songs; and absurd visual gags made with jump cuts and stop motion. These gags regularly depict bizarre ways of gathering or processing ingredients (e.g., chopping vegetables by smashing them with a baking sheet). Despite the levity, You Suck at Cooking does genuinely relate recipe instructions and culinary advice. The recipes are intended for novice chefs; the dishes on the channel rarely end up looking picture-perfect.

You Suck at Cooking has developed a number of inside jokes and running gags. In one recurring storyline, talking eggs act out a police drama; in another, a robot named Pimblokto tries to cook. The narrator of You Suck at Cooking coined his own terms for several kitchen items; he refers to the oven as an "onion" or "undo" (/ˈʌndoʊ/ UN-doh), spatulas as "wangjanglers", and ground pepper as "pepper pepper pepper".

== History ==
You Suck at Cooking uploaded its first video to YouTube on January 13, 2015. There are over 150 episodes as of 2023. While the narrator sometimes invents backstories for himself (and other characters), his real identity is unknown and subject to some fan speculation.

A parody cookbook by the YouTuber, You Suck at Cooking: The Absurdly Practical Guide to Sucking Slightly Less at Making Food, was published in 2019.

== Reception ==
In 2017, You Suck at Cooking was recognized at the 9th Shorty Awards with a nomination in the 'Weird' award category. Celebrity chef Jet Tila once named You Suck at Cooking as his favorite show.
