= Ralph Breaks the Internet =

2018 animated Disney film

- Theatrical release poster
- Directed by: Rich Moore; Phil Johnston
- Screenplay by: Phil Johnston; Pamela Ribon
- Story by: Rich Moore; Phil Johnston; Jim Reardon; Pamela Ribon; Josie Trinidad
- Produced by: Clark Spencer
- Starring: John C. Reilly; Sarah Silverman; Gal Gadot; Jane Lynch; Jack McBrayer; Alan Tudyk; Alfred Molina; Ed O'Neill; Taraji P. Henson
- Cinematography: Nathan Detroit Warner (layout); Brian Leach (lighting)
- Edited by: Jeremy Milton
- Music by: Henry Jackman
- Production company: Walt Disney Animation Studios
- Distributed by: Walt Disney Studios; Motion Pictures (Note: Distributed under the Walt Disney Pictures banner.)
- Release dates: November 5, 2018 (El Capitan Theatre); November 21, 2018 (United States)
- Running time: 112 minutes
- Country: United States
- Language: English
- Budget: $175 million
- Box office: $529.3 million

Ralph Breaks the Internet is a 2018 American animated comedy film produced by Walt Disney Animation Studios. The film was directed by Rich Moore and Phil Johnston and written by Johnston and Pamela Ribon. John C. Reilly, Sarah Silverman, Jack McBrayer, Jane Lynch, and Ed O'Neill reprise their character roles from the first film, with Gal Gadot, Taraji P. Henson, and Alfred Molina joining the cast. Alan Tudyk also returns, voicing a different character. The sequel to Wreck-It Ralph (2012), the film follows Ralph and Vanellope as they travel to the Internet to buy a replacement for the Sugar Rush cabinet's broken steering wheel and prevent Mr. Litwak from disposing of the game.

Discussions about a sequel to Wreck-It Ralph began in September 2012, and the new installment went through three different scripts before the filmmakers settled on the final plot. When it was officially announced in June 2016, most of the original cast confirmed they had signed on, with new cast members added in 2018. The film's title of Ralph Breaks the Internet was announced in March 2017.

Ralph Breaks the Internet premiered in Hollywood, Los Angeles, on November 5, 2018, and was released in the United States on November 21. It was a critical and commercial success, grossing $529 million worldwide against a $175 million budget. It was nominated for Best Animated Feature at the 91st Academy Awards, 76th Golden Globe Awards, 46th Annie Awards, and 24th Critics' Choice Awards.

== Plot ==
Following the downfall of Turbo's reign over Sugar Rush, (Note: As shown in Wreck-It Ralph (2012)) Ralph and Vanellope have stayed best friends, hanging out after work in Litwak's Arcade. Ralph is content with their life, but Vanellope longs for excitement and expresses how bored she has become of Sugar Rush's predictability. To please her, Ralph sneaks into her game and makes a secret road. The next day, when Vanellope fights the arcade player's control to test the track, the cabinet's steering wheel breaks. As the company that made Sugar Rush is out of business, and the cost of a replacement wheel on eBay is expensive, Litwak decides to scrap Sugar Rush and unplugs the game, leaving its citizens homeless. The Surge Protector finds refuge for all Sugar Rush's citizens as a short-term measure as they figure out how to save the game, with Felix and Calhoun adopting the racers. Remembering eBay, Ralph and Vanellope travel through Litwak's new Wi-Fi router to the Internet, a place where websites are represented as buildings in a sprawling city, avatars represent users, and programs are people.

The search engine KnowsMore redirects them to eBay, where they win the auction for the steering wheel by unintentionally spiking the price to US$27,001 only to find they have just 24 hours to raise the funds, or they will lose the bid and the wheel. On the way out, they run into clickbait salesman J. P. Spamley, who brokers items obtained from video games and offers them a lucrative job of stealing a car from Shank, the lead character in the popular racing-centered battle royale game Slaughter Race. They steal Shank's car, but she stops them before they can leave the game with it. Suggesting another way to make money on the Internet, she proceeds to make a viral video of Ralph and uploads it to video-sharing site BuzzzTube. She directs them to BuzzzTube's head algorithm, Yesss, who capitalizes on Ralph's video popularity. They decide to make more videos, which will earn them the money for the wheel if they attract enough views. Vanellope offers to help advertise the videos, and Ralph has Yesss send her to Oh My Disney. There, while being chased by Stormtroopers for unauthorized advertising, Vanellope befriends the Disney Princesses, being encouraged by them to discuss her sense of un-fulfillment and reaching an epiphany in the form of an "I Want" song on the subject. Meanwhile, Ralph makes enough money to buy the wheel but finds Vanellope talking with Shank, overhearing how she wants to stay in Slaughter Race, having felt at home there due to its relative novelty and unpredictability compared to Sugar Rush.

Worried about losing his friend forever, Ralph asks Spamley for a way to draw Vanellope out of the game and is brought to the dark web vendor Double Dan, who provides Ralph with a computer virus, Arthur, that feeds off insecurities and replicates them. When Ralph unleashes Arthur into Slaughter Race, it replicates Vanellope's glitch, triggering a server reboot. Ralph, Shank, and the others help Vanellope escape before the game resets. Vanellope blames herself for the crash, but Ralph confesses to her that it was actually his fault. This revelation outrages Vanellope, as Ralph pointed out she is no better for attempting to leave him without telling him, which causes her to throw away Ralph's cookie medal and run off.

A guilt-ridden Ralph finds his medal now cracked-in-half. In lieu of cyber-insecurities, Arthur copies Ralph's emotional insecurities, and makes dim-witted and emotionally unstable duplicates of Ralph. The clones overrun the Internet in a global DoS attack, all chasing after Vanellope to keep her for themselves. Ralph saves her and attempts to lure the clones into a firewall, but they form a giant Ralph monster that seizes them both. Ralph comes to accept that Vanellope can make her own choices, letting go of his insecurities and causing the clones to disappear, and Ralph and Vanellope reconcile. Ralph gives half of the broken medal to Vanellope and they bid each other a heartfelt farewell as Shank has arranged for Vanellope to respawn in Slaughter Race.

Back in the arcade, Sugar Rush is repaired, and Ralph joins the other arcade characters' activities as he stays in touch with Vanellope over video chat, feeling content with his newfound ability to be independent.

== Cast ==
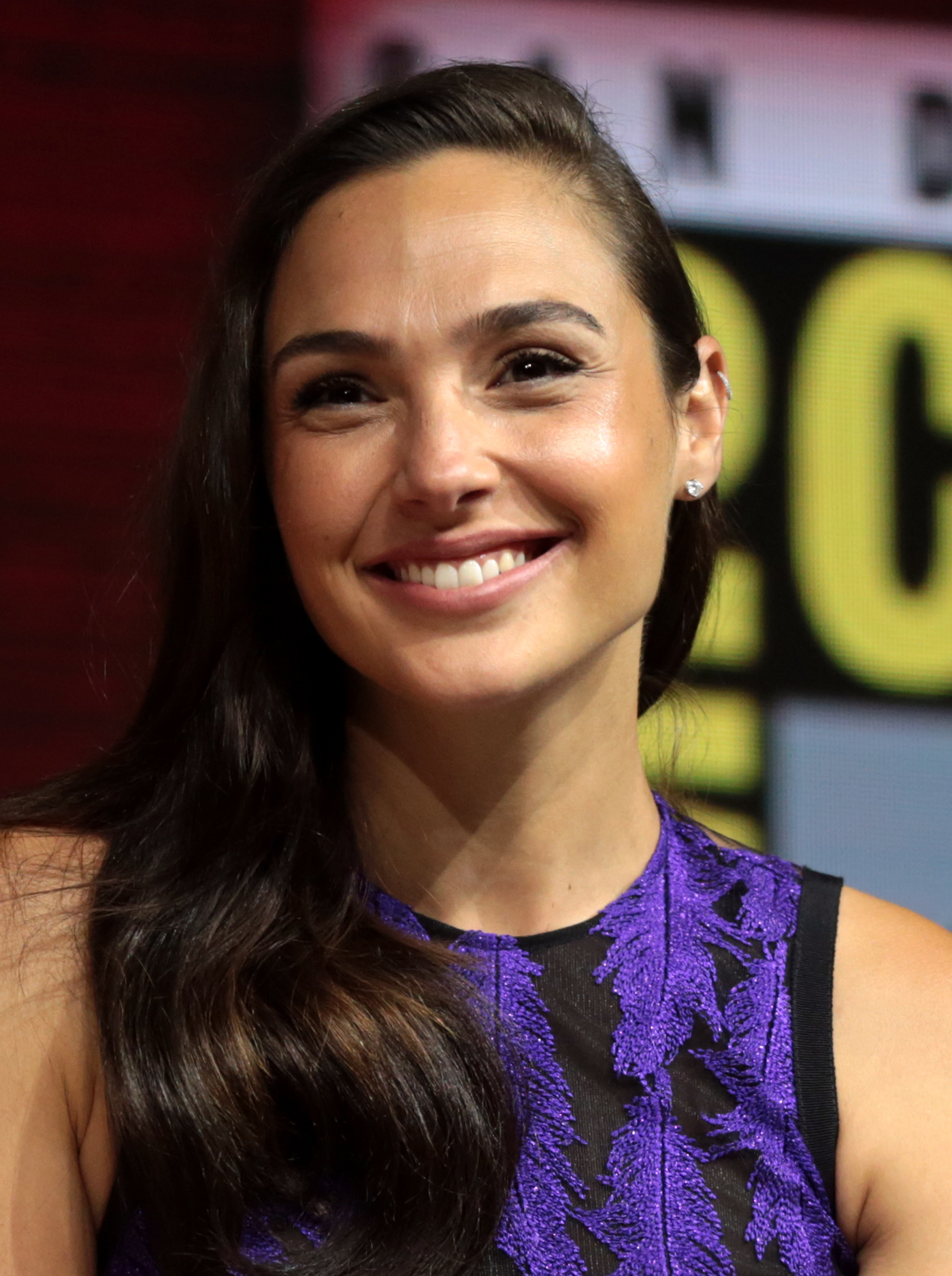
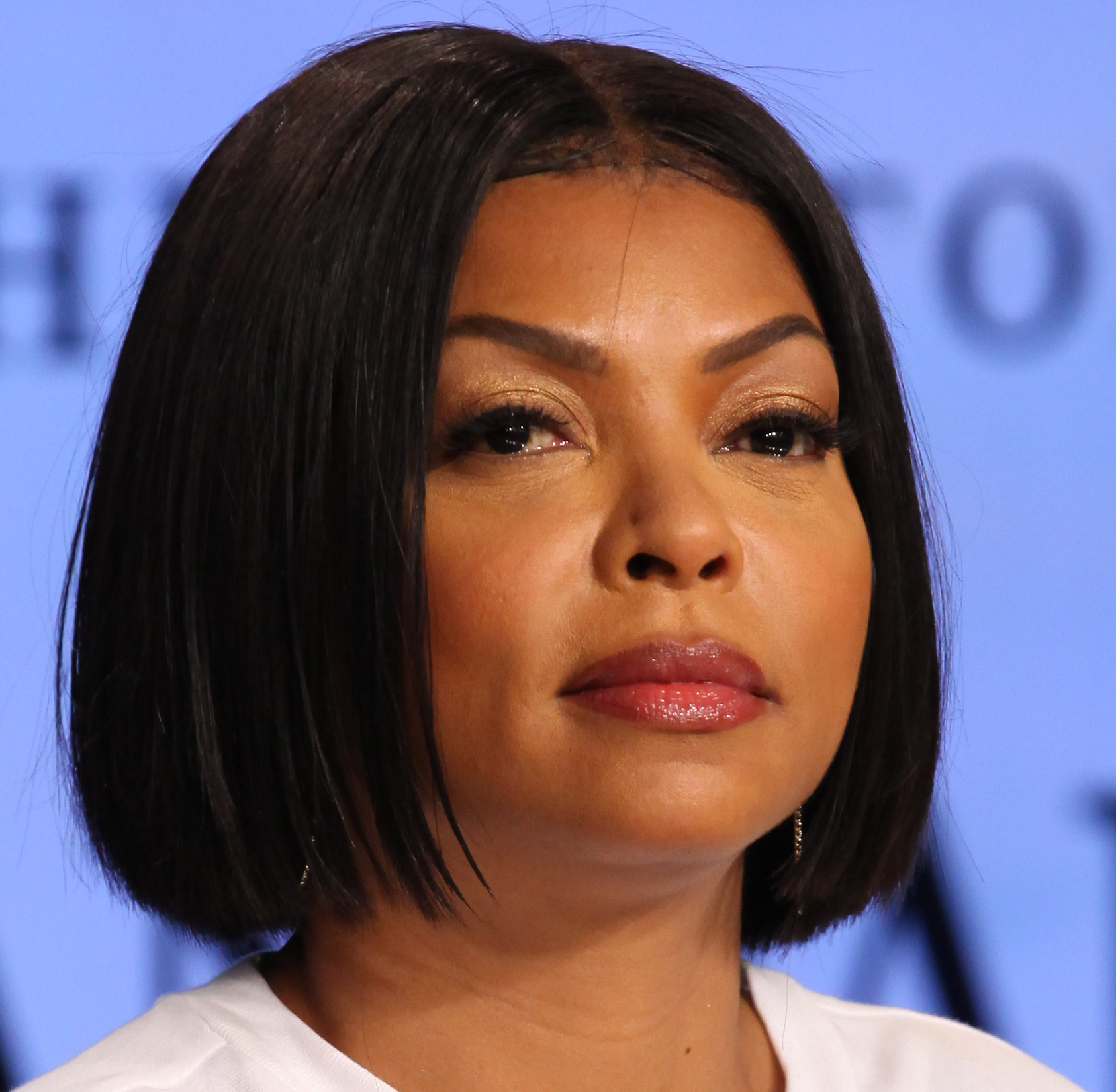
Gal Gadot (left) voiced Shank in the Slaughter Race World; Taraji P. Henson (right) voiced Yesss in the BuzzzTube World
- John C. Reilly as Wreck-It Ralph, a gigantic but soft-hearted man who is the antagonist and boss of the arcade game Fix-It Felix Jr.
- Sarah Silverman as Vanellope von Schweetz, a glitchy racer who is the main character and princess of Sugar Rush and Ralph's best friend.
- Gal Gadot as Shank, a tough and talented NPC racer in Slaughter Race.
- Taraji P. Henson as Yesss, an algorithm that determines the trending videos on BuzzzTube (a portmanteau of YouTube and BuzzFeed). Parts of her character were modeled after Cruella de Vil, as both characters are seen as fashionable.
- Jack McBrayer as Fix-It Felix Jr., a repairman who is the protagonist and playable character of Fix-It Felix Jr., as well as the husband of Calhoun.
- Jane Lynch as Sergeant Tamora Jean Calhoun, the lead character of Hero's Duty and Felix's wife.
- Alan Tudyk as KnowsMore, a character representing a search engine of the same name, with an overly aggressive autofill. The character design was mainly inspired by stylized character designs found in Disney shorts and TV specials done in the mid-1960s by Ward Kimball and Marc Davis. Tudyk previously voiced King Candy in the first film.
- Alfred Molina as Double Dan, a half-worm virus creator who inhabits the dark web.
  - Molina also voices Double Dan's conjoined brother Little Dan.
- Ed O'Neill as Stan Litwak, the owner of Litwak's Family Fun Center & Arcade.

The first 12 characters of the Disney Princess line appear, along with Anna and Elsa from Frozen. All but three of the original voice actresses reprised their roles. Snow White, Cinderella, and Aurora were voiced by Pamela Ribon, Jennifer Hale, and Kate Higgins, respectively, as Adriana Caselotti and Ilene Woods had died and Mary Costa had retired. Additionally, Rajah (Jasmine's pet tiger), Meeko (Pocahontas' pet raccoon), Cinderella's mice (including Jaq and Gus) and her bird companions, and Prince Naveen (in his frog form, whom Ralph mistakes for Frogger) also appear in the film.

Several characters from other films and media also cameo with their original or current voice actors, such as Roger Craig Smith as Sonic the Hedgehog, Maurice LaMarche as Tapper, Brad Garrett as Eeyore from Winnie the Pooh, Corey Burton as Grumpy from Snow White and the Seven Dwarfs, Anthony Daniels as C-3PO from Star Wars, Vin Diesel as Groot from the Marvel Cinematic Universe, and Tim Allen as Buzz Lightyear from Toy Story.

Additionally, Melissa Villaseñor voices Taffyta Muttonfudge, one of the Sugar Rush racers, replacing Mindy Kaling from the first film; Bill Hader is uncredited for his role as J.P. Spamley, a personification of clickbait pop-up ads represented as a desperate salesman who cannot make a sale; John DiMaggio voices Arthur, an insecurity virus; Sean Giambrone (English YouTuber Daniel "DanTDM" Middleton in the UK theatrical version) voices eBoy, an eBay employee who informs Ralph of the status on the eBay item deadline; Flula Borg voices Maybe, an algorithm who is an assistant to Yesss; and Dianna Agron voices the news anchor covering the virus in the real world. Ali Wong, Timothy Simons, GloZell Green, and Hamish Blake, respectively, voice Felony, Butcher Boy, Little Debbie, and Pyro, all of whom are other characters in Slaughter Race as Shank's racing crew. Directors Rich Moore and Phil Johnston reprise their roles as Sour Bill, Zangief (Moore), and the Surge Protector (Johnston), respectively. YouTube personalities Colleen Ballinger, Dani Fernandez, and Tiffany Herrera voice cameos, with Nicole Scherzinger having a cameo role as Mo's Mom in a mid-credits scene.

== Popular culture cameos and references ==
Similar to the first film, Ralph Breaks the Internet includes a number of cameos and references to video games and various Disney properties, including Walt Disney Animation Studios films, Pixar Animation Studios films, Star Wars, Marvel Cinematic Universe, and The Muppets productions. The band Imagine Dragons (whose song "Zero" is featured in a trailer for the film, as well as its end credits and soundtrack) make a cameo appearance in the film, with the members voicing themselves. The video game Fortnite Battle Royale is briefly shown, including the battle bus and the floss dance. Stan Lee, Marvel Comics' former writer, editor and publisher, makes a cameo appearance in the film. Lee died some days before the film's premiere, making his appearance in Ralph Breaks the Internet one of his final cameos in films.

The filmmakers revealed that the film originally featured a joke about Kylo Ren being a "spoiled child", which was later cut from the film by request from Lucasfilm because it would undermine his role as a villain. Also cut from the film was C-3PO being mockingly called R2-D2 and BB-8 by the princesses. Additionally, the film would originally include The Golden Girls characters, but it was later cut because the directors felt it was a bizarre juxtaposition. The legion of Ralph clones, which forms a gigantic Ralph monster, resembles the King Kong character from various films. During production, the giant monster form was dubbed "Ralphzilla" after Godzilla.

== Production ==
=== Development ===
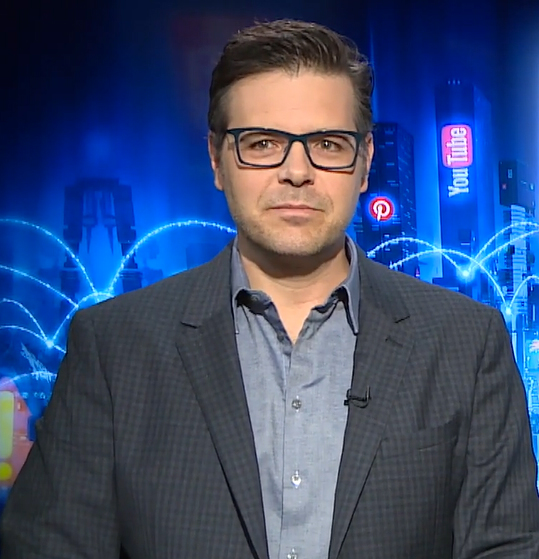
Phil Johnston serves as a director alongside Rich Moore who talks in Ralph Breaks The Internet

In September 2012, two months before Wreck-It Ralph was released, Rich Moore said that there were already ideas for a sequel, and in March 2013, Moore said that he and Disney had ideas about a sequel that would bring the characters up to date and explore online gaming and console gaming. Moore stated that many of the crew and voice cast were open to the sequel, believing that they have "barely scratched the surface" of the video game world they envisioned. He also stated that he planned to include Tron in the sequel, which appears briefly in the film, where Ralph and Vanellope race at the beginning. In 2014, the first film's composer Henry Jackman said that a story for the sequel was being written.

In March 2016, Moore stated that a sequel was still being planned. In June 2016, Walt Disney Animation Studios announced that the sequel would be released on March 9, 2018, with Moore and Phil Johnston attached, and that its story would be one where "Ralph leaves the arcade and wrecks the Internet".

In March 2017, the sequel's title was officially announced as Ralph Breaks the Internet: Wreck-It Ralph 2, with Moore returning as director joined by the first film's co-writer, Johnston, and Clark Spencer also returning as producer. The title is a reference to Kim Kardashian's 2014 photoshoot with Paper. In July 2018, Disney removed Wreck-It Ralph 2 from the film's title.

=== Writing ===
Two working versions of the script had been scrapped before settling on the one used for the film, according to head of story Josie Trinidad. In one version, Vanellope had become self-absorbed by the Internet, gaining popularity and becoming a celebrity among the users. Ralph had been thrown in jail where he met the search engine Knowsmore, and they had partnered together to escape prison and help bring Vanellope back to her normal self. A second version had Ralph becoming an Internet-famous celebrity and would have been challenged by an anti-virus program named BEV that served as a super cop and would have been the story's villain. Trinidad said neither of these versions captured what they felt was the centerpiece of the sequel, being how Ralph and Vanellope reacted to the new world of the Internet and realizing they have separate paths going forward.

Producer Clark Spencer said that "the film is about change. Two best friends are about to realize that the world won't always be the same. The internet is the perfect setting, really, because it's all about change—things change by the second". Director of story Jim Reardon said that it was intimidating to set the film on the Internet, stating that "[They] looked at how [they] could make the internet relatable on a human level—like how Game Central Station aka the power strip mirrored a train station in the first movie." Reardon, however, said that Disney "didn't want to make the movie about the internet", instead focus on Ralph and Vanellope's friendship, and to treat the Internet as "the place where the movie takes place". Josie Trinidad claimed that the filmmakers "didn't want to just give the audience more of that friendship — [people had] to see that relationship grow."

The designs of scenes within the Internet were based on tours made of One Wilshire in Los Angeles, as it is one of the world's largest telecommunications centers. The filmmakers did not approach any of the companies (outside of Disney) that are represented on the Internet and strove to include net branding from all across the world. They also had to explore various Internet memes, making sure to avoid those that lacked long-term presence on the Internet. While the film addresses many positive elements of the Internet, the filmmakers did not want to shy away from covering some of the more unpleasant aspects about it, in part fueled by the success of tackling racism indirectly within Zootopia. They wanted to follow the same approach as they had with Judy Hopps in Zootopia, where she experienced, learned, and overcame the racism aspects, and have Ralph similarly learn and become a better person without having to actually solve the issue of hostility on the Internet.

The scene where Vanellope is introduced to the Disney Princesses came from screenwriter Pamela Ribon. In 2014, Ribon was still working on Moana when Disney began internally pitching ideas for the sequel to Wreck-It Ralph, Ribon recognized that like the title character of Moana, Vanellope fits the definition of a Disney Princess. When work formally began on the sequel after the completion of Zootopia, Ribon pitched the idea of Disney poking fun at itself by having Vanellope meet the other Disney Princesses in the green room of OhMyDisney.com, the Disney fan-driven website. Further inspiration came from a BuzzFeed online quiz that asked which Disney Princess the user was; Moore thought it would be interesting if Ralph had encountered that quiz and ended up in an argument with Vanellope over the result. The script was written by Ribon, in which she wanted to include the various tropes of the Princesses, with them making in the final cut for the film. Moore and Johnston were satisfied with the script.

=== Casting ===
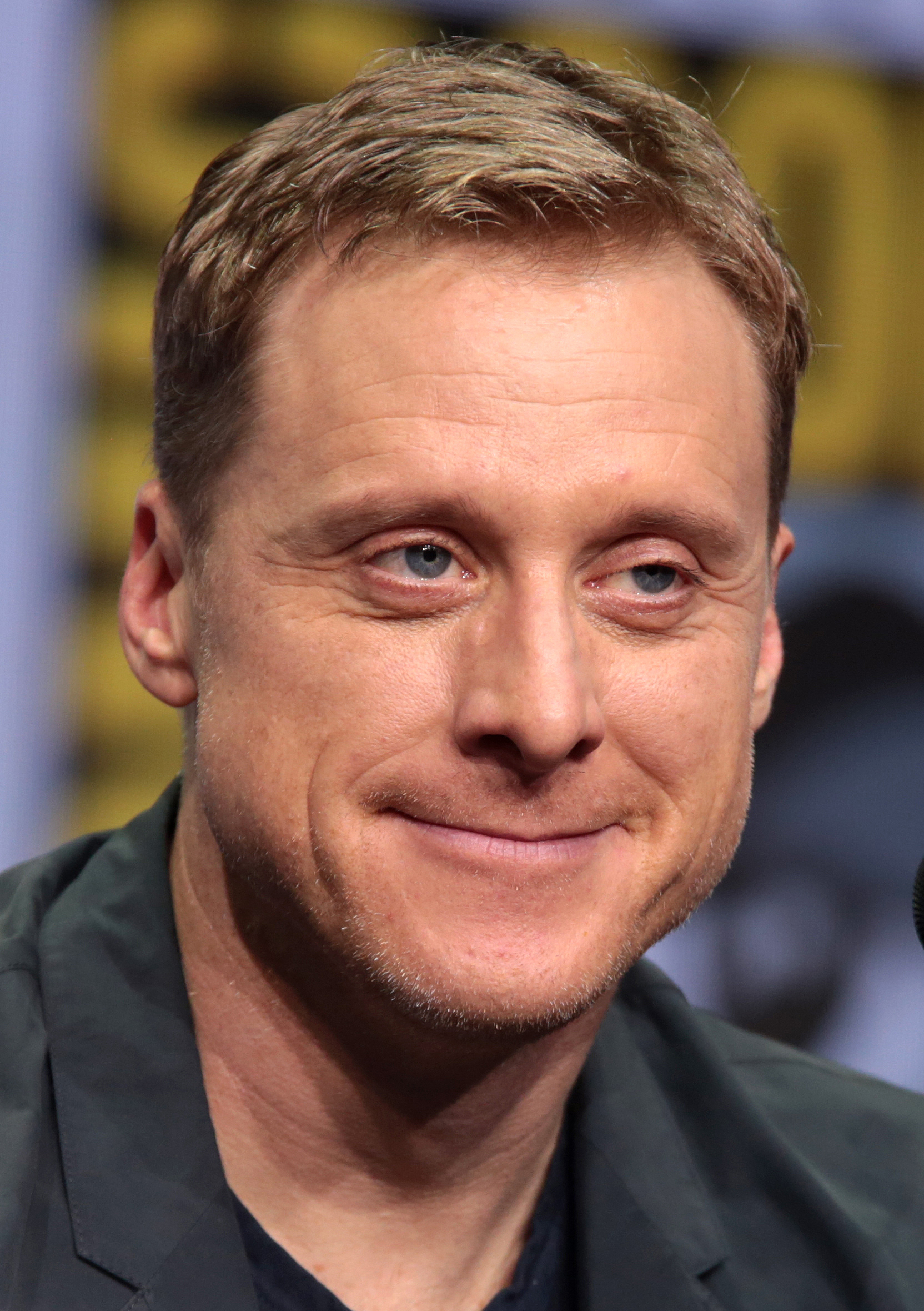
Alan Tudyk returns to voice a different character, named KnowsMore. Tudyk previously voiced King Candy in the first film.

In July 2015, John C. Reilly said he had signed on to reprise his role of Ralph in a projected sequel. In March 2017, Jane Lynch, Jack McBrayer and Sarah Silverman were reported as being set to reprise their roles. In December 2016, Alan Tudyk confirmed his return in the sequel as a different character, named KnowsMore, after previously voicing King Candy in the first film. During production, Moore invited film composer Michael Giacchino to reprise his role as the Stormtrooper FN-3128 from Star Wars: The Force Awakens in the film. In August 2018, actress Gal Gadot joined the cast as Shank. The production team secured all the Disney Princesses' original voice actresses, except for Adriana Caselotti as Snow White, Ilene Woods as Cinderella and Mary Costa as Aurora, due to the formers having both died in 1997 and 2010 respectively, while the latter retired from acting in 2000. Jennifer Hale and Kate Higgins, the current voice actresses for Cinderella and Aurora, were hired for the film; Pamela Ribon, the film's co-screenwriter, performed Snow White's voice for temporary tracks, but the team considered it a good substitute, allowing Ribon to voice her in the final film.

=== Animation ===
The film contains over 150 unique sets and 5,726 assets, and includes the highest number of characters in any Disney Animation film, with 434 individual characters with 6,752 variants. One of the Disney animators who helped out to bring the Disney Princesses into CGI animation was Mark Henn, who was also the original supervising animator of princesses Ariel, Belle, Jasmine, Mulan, and Tiana. Henn also served as the supervising animator for the film's background hand-drawn animated characters. Animators had to work out various techniques to take the different styles of animation into a single approach, and figure out the proportions of the characters using official figurines. Unlike their original film counterparts, the Disney Princesses in the film were rendered in a more cartoony style with bigger eyes and ears.

In the initial trailer for the film, the African-American princess character Tiana appeared to have a lighter skin tone, a narrower nose, and more European features than she did in the 2009 film The Princess and the Frog. This led to some backlashes on social media as these drew her appearance away from that expected of African-Americans. As a result, Disney contacted Tiana's voice actress, Anika Noni Rose, and the advocacy group Color of Change to redesign Tiana for Ralph Breaks the Internet to make sure she resembles more closely to her 2009 appearance; the updated character model was revealed in the second trailer. The same treatment was given to Pocahontas, the titular character of the 1995 film, as many viewers had pointed out that she was also given a much lighter skin tone.

A scene featured in the film's original teaser, released in March 2018, involving Ralph and Vanellope invading a children's game and feeding pancakes to a bunny to the point that it is implied to explode, was heavily discussed prior to the film's release; however, the scene was eventually cut from the film and instead placed halfway through the credits, with the addition of a meta-conversation where one of the characters alludes to having just watched a movie where a scene from the trailer was missing. The post-credits scene involves what starts as a teaser for Frozen II but cuts to Ralph rickrolling the audience by starting to sing Rick Astley's "Never Gonna Give You Up". While producers Spencer and Moore had an idea of Ralph doing a "Wreck Roll" early on in the film's development, they never incorporated it into the story. As it was one of the last scenes added, the producers had gotten Reilly, who was on vacation with his family at the time, to come into a New York City studio to record for the day so that the animators could work from that.

=== Music and soundtrack ===
On September 19, 2018, Imagine Dragons released the lead single from the soundtrack titled "Zero", which plays during the end credits of the film. On October 23, 2018, the music video of "Zero" was posted on Imagine Dragons' YouTube channel. The film features an original song called "A Place Called Slaughter Race", performed by Sarah Silverman and Gal Gadot, written by Tom MacDougall and the film's co-director Phil Johnston, and composed by Alan Menken; the song's pop version, "In This Place", was performed by Julia Michaels. The film also features songs from various Disney Princess films, as well as Demi Lovato's cover of "Let it Go" played in the beginning of the Oh My Disney scene. Ralph also rickrolls the tune "Never Gonna Give You Up" by Rick Astley in a post-credits scene. The soundtrack was composed by Henry Jackman, who also composed the score from the previous film. It was released digitally on November 16, 2018, and on CD on November 30, 2018.

== Marketing ==
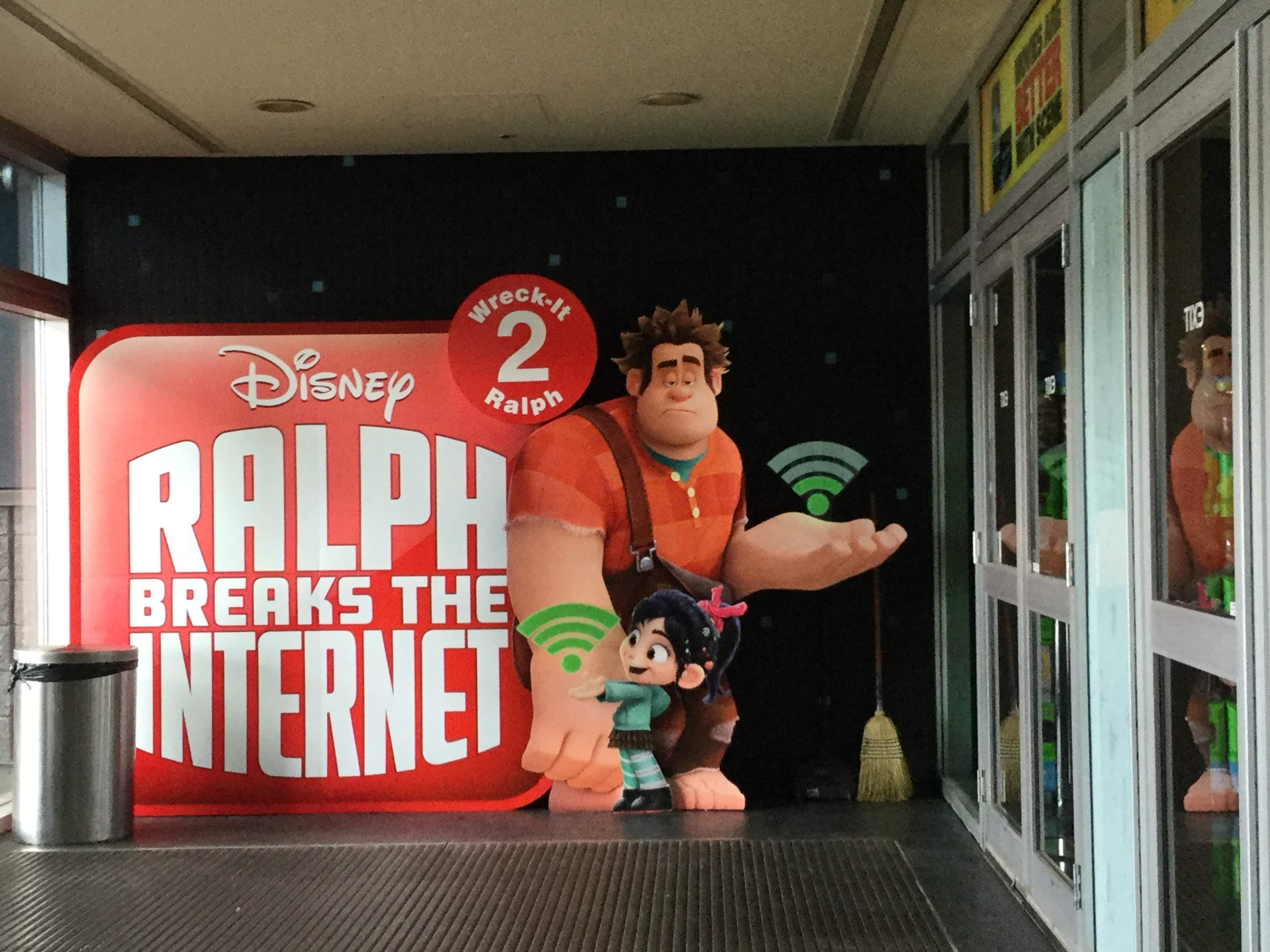
A promotional standee for the movie at the Cineplex Odeon movie theatre in Edmonton in 2018

To coincide with the film's release, Fortnite Battle Royale made a cameo appearance of Ralph via an "outdoor cinema screen" in the game's location "Risky Reels" and added the emote dance Hot Marat, which was available as a limited time offering. For "Wreck Urselfie", a mobile experience used to build scenarios with Google Home featured Ralph and Vanellope stuck inside users' smartphones, as Google BrandLab used Google's API Cloud Vision. The first WhatsApp experience that allowed fans to connect with Ralph and Vanellope while they navigated the Internet and ended up in WhatsApp. Amazon, which promoted the film with its products FireTV and the Kindle Fire, and its subsidiary IMDb, announced the "Pre-Black Friday sale" through the "themed landing page," which was seen in the scene where Ralph "broke" its home page. Furthermore, fans had some Disney offers and continued to connect the purchase of the film's tickets. Carvana and Disney collaborated to promote the film's release throughout a multi-channel campaign. The film collaborated with the mobile in-cinema game Noovie Arcade, which tied the video game used in the film's teaser, the "pancake milkshake", causing audiences to have each other's challenges and gain scores and milkshakes at least 21,100 theaters including AMC Theatres, Cinemark, and Regal Cinemas. The virtual reality experience based on the film, which was created in collaboration with ILMxLab and The Void, titled Ralph Breaks VR. Aside from the film, it takes on a different plot. Additional marketing partners for the film included BAPE, eBay, Fandango, Mailchimp, McDonald's, Netgear, and Purple.

In the month of the release of the film, the world builder video game Disney Magic Kingdoms included a limited time Event focused on Ralph Breaks the Internet to promote it, with the characters involved in a new storyline unrelated to the events of the film, including Ralph, Vanellope, Yesss, Shank, Spamley, Felix, and Calhoun as playable characters, some attractions based on locations of the film, and the Comfy Costumes that Cinderella, Ariel, Belle, and Jasmine wear in the film.

== Release ==
=== Theatrical ===
Ralph Breaks the Internet premiered on November 5, 2018, at the El Capitan Theatre in Hollywood, Los Angeles. It was initially scheduled for release on March 9, but was later pushed back to November 21. The film was also released in IMAX and 3D formats.

=== Home media ===
Ralph Breaks the Internet was released by Walt Disney Studios Home Entertainment on digital on February 12, 2019, and on Blu-ray and DVD on February 26. (The 3-D version of the film was released only in Japan, in a 4K/Blu-ray combo pack on April 24, 2019.) Bonus features include a behind-the-scenes featurette, a short highlighting some of the Easter eggs hidden throughout the film, deleted scenes, and the music videos for "Zero" and "In This Place". A feature exclusive to the digital release is a featurette on the artists going to race car driving school to research all the driving in Slaughter Race. In its first week, Ralph Breaks the Internet sold 225,099 DVDs and 816,890 Blu-rays as the most sold film on both formats in the United States. Overall, Ralph Breaks the Internet sold 616,387 DVDs and 1.4 million Blu-rays, adding them up to get a total of 2 million copies, and made $47.7 million through home media releases.

== Reception ==
=== Box office ===
Ralph Breaks the Internet grossed $201.1 million in the United States and Canada, and $328.2 million in other territories, for a total worldwide gross of $529.3 million, against a production budget of $175 million.

In the United States and Canada, Ralph Breaks the Internet was released alongside Creed II and Robin Hood, as well as the wide expansion of Green Book, and was originally projected to gross $67–77 million from 3,900+ theaters in its five-day opening weekend. The film made $18.3 million on its first day (including a pre-Thanksgiving record $3.8 million from Tuesday previews) and another $10.2 million on its second. It went on to debut to $55.7 million in its opening weekend (a five-day total of $84.5 million), finishing first at the box office and marking the second-best Thanksgiving opening behind Disney's Frozen ($93.6 million). In its second weekend the film made $25.8 million, dropping 54% but remaining in first. For the third weekend, it topped the box office once again with $16.1 million, dropping 37%. In its second and third weekends the film finished ahead of The Grinch, marking the first time where animated films reached the top two spots at the box office for two consecutive weekends.

=== Critical response ===
On the review aggregator website Rotten Tomatoes, 88% of 274 critics' reviews are positive, with an average rating of 7.3/10. The website's consensus reads: "Ralph Breaks the Internet levels up on its predecessor with a funny, heartwarming sequel that expands its colorful universe while focusing on core characters and relationships." Metacritic, which uses a weighted average, assigned the film a score of 71 out of 100, based on 43 critics, indicating "generally favorable" reviews. Audiences polled by CinemaScore gave the film an average grade of "A−" on an A+ to F scale, down from the "A" earned by the first film, and those at PostTrak gave the film four stars out of five.

Bilge Ebiri of The New York Times gave the film a positive review, saying that "somewhere amid the film's ornate imagery and deliriously irreverent humor, we might begin to realize that we're watching a terrifying, incisive satire about the ways that a life lived online makes monsters of us all". Brian Lowry of CNN said that "The colorful action should delight tykes, but the smart, media-savvy asides make it especially appealing to grownups". Kerry Lengel of The Arizona Republic gave the film three-and-a-half stars out of five, saying "what makes the movie compelling, despite the subdued dramatic payoff, is that it is a heightened reflection of our experience—our love affair, really—with our gadgets, our apps and, yes, our brands". Peter Hartlaub of the San Francisco Chronicle gave the film three stars out of four, stating that the film is "almost always inspired in the moment" and said that "the new characters are all pretty great", though he said that the film's first third "struggles to find its focus", and felt that Felix and Calhoun's subplot "would have worked better as a pre-movie animated short". Chris Bumbray of JoBlo's Movie Emporium said that the film "is just as solid" as the first film, and said it was compared to the science fiction film Ready Player One. Bryan Bishop of The Verge described the film as "The Lego Movie of Disney films", stating that it "soars when it sends up the studio's own films, but its portrayal of the internet feels a little optimistic for 2018."

Oliver Jones of The New York Observer gave the film a two-and-a-half score, saying that "Ralph Breaks the Internet is a candy coated, hard shined brick of postmodernism—a Vitamix smoothie of gags, nostalgia, product placement and Fruity Pebbles". Alonso Duralde of TheWrap said that "Within a few years, the specifics of the viral-video gags in Ralph Breaks the Internet will be as dated as a Tay Zonday joke". Peter Bradshaw of The Guardian said that the "sequel to the 2012 film is somewhere between Ready Player One and The Emoji Movie, summoning up a zero-gravity spectacle of dazzling colours and vertiginous perspectives, a featureless and inert mashup of memes, brands, avatars, and jokes".

=== Accolades ===
Accolades received by Ralph Breaks the Internet
Award	Date of ceremony	Category	Recipient(s)	Result	Ref.
Academy Awards	February 24, 2019	Best Animated Feature	Rich Moore, Phil Johnston, and Clark Spencer	Nominated	
Alliance of Women Film Journalists	January 10, 2019	Best Animated Feature Film	Rich Moore and Phil Johnston	Nominated	
Alliance of Women Film Journalists	January 10, 2019	Best Animated Female	Sarah Silverman	Nominated	
Annie Awards	February 2, 2019				
Annie Awards	February 2, 2019	Best Animated Feature	Ralph Breaks the Internet	Nominated	
Annie Awards	February 2, 2019	Outstanding Achievement for Animated Effects in an Animated Feature Production	Cesar Velazquez, Marie Tollec, Alexander Moaveni, Peter DeMund, and Ian J. Coony	Won	
Annie Awards	February 2, 2019	Outstanding Achievement for Character Animation in an Animated Feature Production	Vitor Vilela	Nominated	
Annie Awards	February 2, 2019	Outstanding Achievement for Character Design in an Animated Feature Production	Ami Thompson	Nominated	
Annie Awards	February 2, 2019	Annie Award for Directing in a Feature Production	Rich Moore and Phil Johnston	Nominated	
Annie Awards	February 2, 2019	Annie Award for Music in a Feature Production	Henry Jackman, Alan Menken, Phil Johnston, Tom MacDougall, and Dan Reynolds	Nominated	
Annie Awards	February 2, 2019	Outstanding Achievement for Storyboarding in an Animated Feature Production	Michael Herrera	Nominated	
Annie Awards	February 2, 2019	Annie Award for Voice Acting in a Feature Production	Sarah Silverman	Nominated	
Annie Awards	February 2, 2019	Annie Award for Writing in a Feature Production	Phil Johnston and Pamela Ribon	Nominated	
Annie Awards	February 2, 2019	Outstanding Achievement for Editorial in an Animated Feature Production	Jeremy Milton, Fabienne Rawley, Jesse Averna, John Wheeler, and Pace Raulsen	Nominated	
Chicago Film Critics Association Awards	December 7, 2018	Best Animated Feature	Ralph Breaks the Internet	Nominated	
Cinema Audio Society Awards	February 16, 2019	Outstanding Achievement in Sound Mixing for a Motion Picture – Animated	Gabriel Guy, Paul McGrath, David E. Fluhr, Alan Meyerson, Doc Kane, and Scott Curtis	Nominated	
Critics' Choice Movie Awards	January 13, 2019	Best Animated Feature	Rich Moore and Phil Johnston	Nominated	
Detroit Film Critics Society	December 3, 2018	Best Animated Film	Ralph Breaks the Internet	Nominated	
Golden Globe Awards	January 6, 2019	Best Animated Feature Film	Rich Moore and Phil Johnston	Nominated	
Golden Trailer Awards	May 31, 2018	Best Animation/Family	"Wired Refresh" (MOCEAN)	Nominated	
Kids' Choice Awards	March 23, 2019	Favorite Animated Movie	Ralph Breaks the Internet	Nominated	
Kids' Choice Awards	March 23, 2019	Favorite Female Voice from an Animated Movie	Gal Gadot	Nominated	
Producers Guild of America Award	January 19, 2019	Best Animated Motion Picture	Clark Spencer	Nominated	
San Diego Film Critics Society Awards	December 10, 2018	Best Animated Film	Ralph Breaks the Internet	Nominated	
San Diego Film Critics Society Awards	December 10, 2018	Best Body of Work	John C. Reilly	Won	
Satellite Awards	February 22, 2019	Best Animated or Mixed Media Feature	Ralph Breaks the Internet	Nominated	
Saturn Awards	September 13, 2019	Best Animated Film	Ralph Breaks the Internet	Nominated	
Visual Effects Society Awards	February 5, 2019	Outstanding Visual Effects in an Animated Feature	Scott Kersavage, Bradford Simonsen, Ernest J. Petti, and Cory Loftis	Nominated	
Visual Effects Society Awards	February 5, 2019	Outstanding Animated Character in an Animated Feature	Dong Joo Byun, Dave K. Komorowski, Justin Sklar, and Le Joyce Tong for "Ralphzilla"	Nominated	
Visual Effects Society Awards	February 5, 2019	Outstanding Created Environment in an Animated Feature	Benjamin Min Huang, Jon Kim Krummel II, Gina Warr Lawes, and Matthias Lechner for "Social Media District"	Nominated	
Visual Effects Society Awards	February 5, 2019	Outstanding Effects Simulations in an Animated Feature	Paul Carman, Henrik Fält, Christopher Hendryx, and David Hutchins for "Virus Infection & Destruction"	Nominated	
Washington D.C. Area Film Critics Association Awards	December 3, 2018	Best Animated Feature	Rich Moore and Phil Johnston	Nominated	
Washington D.C. Area Film Critics Association Awards	December 3, 2018	Best Animated Voice Performance	Sarah Silverman	Nominated	

== Future ==
In November 2018, John C. Reilly said that if a third film was to be made, he would consider seeing Ralph and Vanellope "beaming themselves right out into space". In November 2026, Disney Animation CCO Jared Bush expressed hope for more Wreck-It Ralph content, stating that he would like to revisit the franchise.

== Bibliography ==
- Julius, Jessica (2018). The Art of Ralph Breaks the Internet (1st ed.). Chronicle Books. ISBN 978-1-4521-6368-0.
