= Relaxacon =

Informal science fiction convention

A relaxacon (sometimes relaxicon) is a science fiction convention which has little formal programming and very few organized activities, as the point is that the organizers can relax during the convention. Though informal, relaxacons can occur on a regularly scheduled basis, such as Arisia Inc.'s Relaxacon, which was held yearly from 2006 through 2019. Starting in 2021 the running of the Arisia Relaxacon was taken over by Massachusetts Convention Fandom, Inc. (MCFI) with an attempt to make it more of a general Boston and East Coast area Relaxacon.

Relaxacons are generally small, ranging from 50 to 200 attendees. They are often invitation or word-of-mouth only. They are a chance for the organizers of a large convention to get together with the other organizers and relax once the convention is over, and are held a month or more after the regular convention. Some large conventions use relaxacons as a reward for volunteers, and as a way of using up leftover supplies (similar to a dead dog party). This can be seen as contributing to SMOF-ish behavior, which some members of the fandom can find off-putting.

== History ==
The first convention that was labelled as relaxacon was Midwestcon in 1950. Science fiction author Jack Chalker suggested the term originated at the 1966 Midwestcon. However, earlier uses of the word have possibly been identified in a 1956 issue of the newszine Fantasy Times and a 1957 issue of The Magazine of Fantasy and Science Fiction. Both instances used the spelling "relaxicon".

== Sercon ==
Relaxacons are often contrasted with sercon conventions, ones (purportedly) devoted solely to serious constructive discussion of science fiction topics. Organizers of most of those conventions sometimes described as "sercon" tend to be uncomfortable with the label, since the term originally implied a highly unfannish lack of a sense of fun and self-perspective.
