= Crusoe the Dachshund =

Dachshund dog and internet celebrity (born 2009)

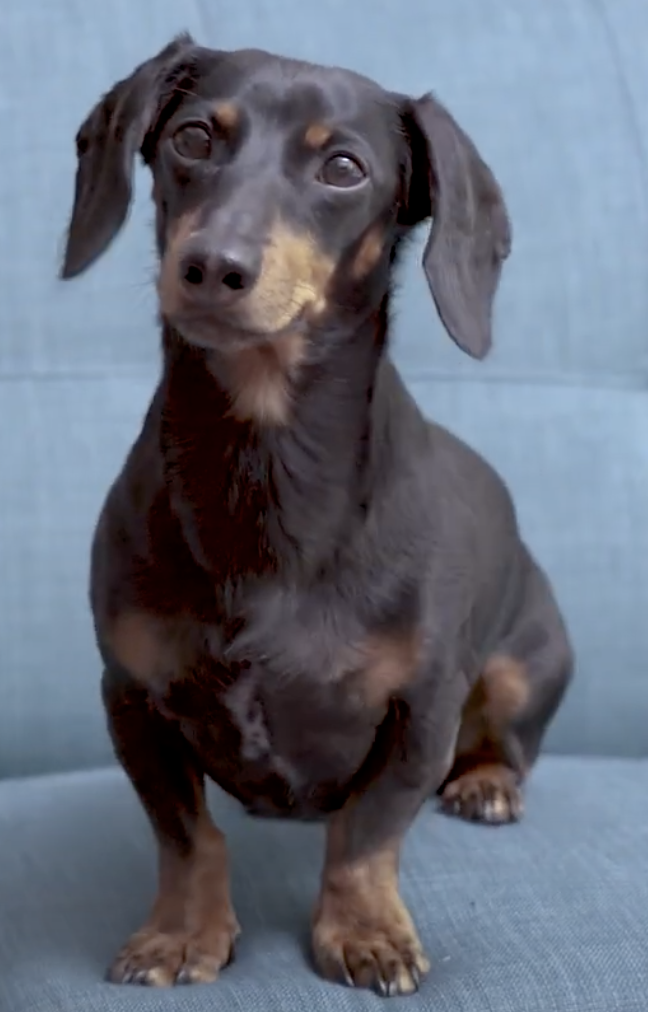
- Crusoe in 2020
- Breed: Miniature Dachshund
- Sex: Male
- Born: October 28, 2009 (age 17)
- Known for: Internet celebrity
- Owner: Ryan Beauchesne

Crusoe the Dachshund (born October 28, 2009) is a miniature black and tan Dachshund dog living in Ottawa, Canada who gained internet fame for his homemade costumes and viral videos. He plays characters including chef, superhero, captain, fisherman, golfer, hockey player, jazz man, and accountant.

== Life ==
Crusoe began appearing on social media in 2011 with the self-appointed title of "celebrity" as a sarcastic moniker. Two books were published in Crusoe's name: Crusoe the Celebrity Dachshund: Adventures of the Wiener Dog Extraordinaire, and Crusoe, the Worldly Wiener Dog: Further Adventures with the Celebrity Dachshund. Crusoe won Best Animal category at the Shorty Awards and the 2018 People's Choice Award for Animal Star, leading to him being branded an “internet celebrity”.

Crusoe underwent emergency surgery in August 2016 for Intervertebral Disc Disease, a common condition for Dachshunds.

As of 2018, Crusoe had over 3 million Facebook likes, 700,000 Instagram followers, and over 2,200,000 subscribers to his YouTube channel. Crusoe has appeared on such media outlets as Good Morning America, Mashable, New York Mag, BuzzFeed, NHL.com, and ESPN. His travels have been covered by Metro, Lonely Planet, and HuffPost. Crusoe also attended the 2018 People's Choice Awards in Los Angeles.

An online advertisement for GoPro and a television commercial for the Recreational Boating & Fishing Foundation both featured clips of Crusoe fishing. Crusoe was also the face of the Heinz Wiener Stampede Super Bowl ad campaign in 2016.
