= James Breakwell =

Comedy writer

James Breakwell is an American comedy writer who writes on a variety of topics, including parenting. He also runs a Twitter account with the username @XplodingUnicorn, a name that comes from Breakwell's comedy brand, Exploding Unicorn. His articles have been featured in Reader’s Digest, The Federalist, AskMen, and Vox.

James Breakwell is a pen name.

== Books ==
James Breakwell released his first book with BenBella Books on October 10, 2017: Only Dead on the Inside: A Parent’s Guide for Surviving the Zombie Apocalypse, a mash-up of a traditional parenting advice book and a zombie survival guide. He is also the author of a science fiction novel, The Chosen Twelve, published in January 2022.

== Podcasts ==
Breakwell co-hosts two podcasts with psychologist, broadcaster and biographer Steve Olivas: Wrong And Wronger and 10 Minutes To Save Your Marriage. In October 2018, he was a guest star on the unscripted Canadian podcast I Hate It But I Love It.

== Awards ==
Closer Magazine named Breakwell its 2016 Blogger Dad of the Year. In 2017, he was a finalist for a Shorty Award in the parenting category.

== Books ==
Year	Title	Publisher	ISBN	Pages	Notes
2017	Only Dead on the Inside: A Parent's Guide to Surviving the Zombie Apocalypse	BenBella Books	1944648631	200	
2018	Bare Minimum Parenting: The Ultimate Guide to Not Quite Ruining Your Child	BenBella Books	1946885320	256	
2019	How to Save Your Child from Ostrich Attacks, Accidental Time Travel, and Anything Else that Might Happen on an Average Tuesday	BenBella Books	1948836459	200	
2020	Prance Like No One's Watching: A Guided Journal for Exploding Unicorns	BuzzPop	1499810318	96	
2021	How to Be a Man (Whatever That Means): Lessons in Modern Masculinity from a Questionable Source	BenBella Books	1950665909	218	
2022	The Chosen Twelve	Solaris	1786185172	384	
2023	You Can't Be A Pterodactyl	Penguin	059311065X	32	
