= Kołodziejczyk =

Kołodziejczyk (Polish pronunciation: [kɔwɔˈd͡ʑɛjt͡ʂɨk]) is a Polish-language occupational surname derived from the occupation of kołodziej ("wheelwright"). Notable people with this surname include:

- Cody Kolodziejzyk (born 1990), Canadian Internet personality and rapper
- Dariusz Kołodziejczyk (born 1962), Polish historian
- Greg Kolodziejzyk (born 1961), Canadian cyclist
- Katarzyna Kołodziejczyk (born 1998), Polish sprint canoeist
- Nikola Kołodziejczyk (born 1986), Polish musician
- Piotr Kołodziejczyk (1939–2019), Polish Minister of National Defence
