= TMG Studios =

Podcast network and production company

- Formerly: Tiny Meat Gang Studios
- Type: Private
- Industry: Podcasting; digital media
- Founded: October 2021; 4 years ago
- Founders: Cody Ko; Noel Miller
- Headquarters: Los Angeles, California, U.S.
- Key people: Noel Miller (owner)
- Products: Podcasts; video podcasts; live events
- Website: tmgstudios.tv

TMG Studios, formerly known as Tiny Meat Gang Studios, is an American podcast network and production company based in Los Angeles. Founded in October 2021 by YouTubers and comedians Cody Ko and Noel Miller, the network produces comedy and pop culture podcasts distributed across Spotify, Apple Podcasts, YouTube, and other platforms. Miller has been the sole owner since 2024, when Ko departed the company.

== History ==
=== Founding and early growth (2017–2022) ===
Ko and Miller began the Tiny Meat Gang Podcast in October 2017 after YouTube began demonetizing their videos for profanity, prompting them to seek an alternative revenue stream. The podcast won the Shorty Award for Best Podcast in 2019. In October 2021, Ko and Miller formalized their podcasting operations by founding Tiny Meat Gang Studios, with the flagship podcast as its anchor.

By December 2022, the studio had grown to seven original shows, employed 12 full-time staff members, and operated out of a Los Angeles studio. The network's podcasts had collectively surpassed 200 million downloads by that time. Both founders were represented by United Talent Agency (UTA), which assisted in the network's expansion.

=== Ko's departure and reorganization (2024) ===
In July 2024, Ko stepped down from day-to-day operations at TMG Studios after allegations surfaced that he had a sexual relationship with influencer Tana Mongeau when she was 17 and he was 25. The network briefly halted production across its slate of shows in the wake of the controversy. The Emergency Intercom podcast, which had recently joined the network, left TMG Studios during this period to produce independently.

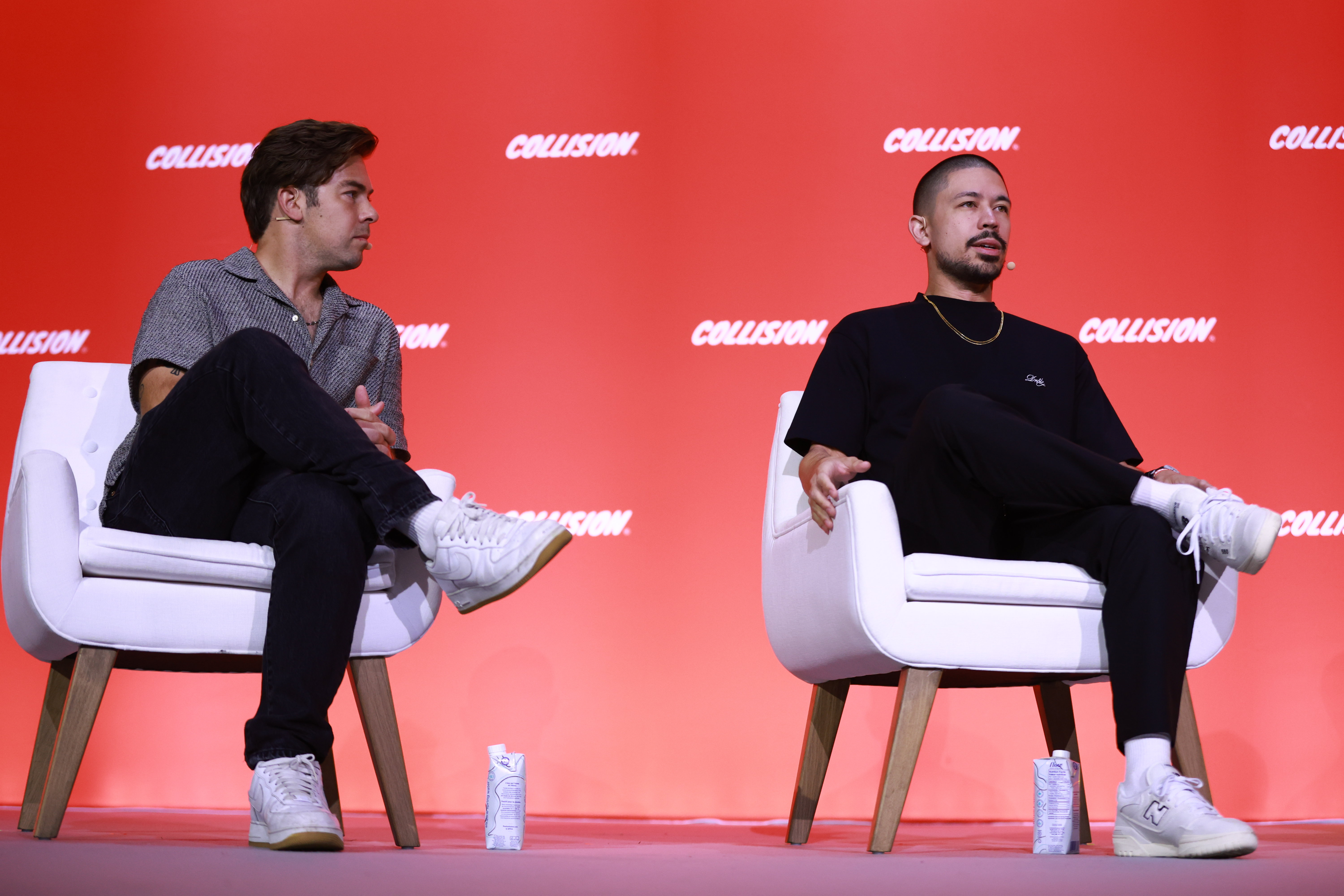
Ko and Miller in 2023

Miller continued as the sole host of the flagship podcast and assumed leadership of the network. He subsequently confirmed he had become the sole owner of TMG Studios.

=== Expansion under Miller (2025) ===
In August 2025, TMG Studios announced the addition of five new shows to its roster, more than doubling its programming slate. The expansion included refreshed branding and an updated website. Miller told TheWrap that the studio aimed to function as a creative production partner rather than a traditional podcast network.

The flagship Tiny Meat Gang Podcast aired its final episode on November 28, 2025, after more than 770 episodes spanning eight years. Miller stated that the show had continued in part to fulfill existing advertising contracts and support the studio's staff during the transition period following Ko's departure.

== Programming ==
TMG Studios' programming focuses primarily on comedy, pop culture, and internet humor, targeting a young adult audience. The network has emphasized video podcast production, investing in distinctive set designs for each show. Shows are distributed with ads on major podcast platforms, with bonus and ad-free episodes available to paid subscribers through the company's website.

== Distribution and business model ==
TMG Studios distributes its podcasts on major platforms including Spotify, Apple Podcasts, and YouTube. Free episodes are ad-supported, while extended and bonus episodes are available through a paid subscription on the company's website.

The company also generates revenue through merchandise sold through its website and live events. Ko and Miller staged a sold-out comedy and rap tour in 2021, and Miller has since toured independently as a stand-up comedian.

== See also ==
- Cody Ko
- Noel Miller
