= The Real Bros of Simi Valley =

American mockumentary television series

- Genre: Comedy; Parody; Mockumentary
- Created by: Jimmy Tatro; Christian A. Pierce
- Written by: Jimmy Tatro; Christian A. Pierce
- Directed by: Jimmy Tatro; Michael J. Gallagher
- Starring: Jimmy Tatro; Nick Colletti; Tanner Petulla; Cody Ko; Colleen Donovan; Peter Gilroy; Monette Moio; Monica Joy Sherer; Maddy Whitby
- Theme music composer: Jason Moss
- Composer: Bulletproof Bear
- Country of origin: United States
- Original language: English
- No. of seasons: 3
- No. of episodes: 25

Production
- Executive producers: Jimmy Tatro; Christian A. Pierce; Mike Rosenstein; Michael Schreiber; Anjuli Hinds; Adam Boorstin; Dan Weinstein
- Producers: Michael Wormser; Jana Winternitz; Jason Korstad; Nick Phillips
- Cinematography: Arjun Prakash; Jonathan Nicholas
- Editors: Nick Smith; Grant McFadden; Patrick Graneros; Hank Friedmann; Patrick Nelson Barnes
- Running time: 6–25 minutes
- Production companies: Cinemand; Studio 71; Out of Pocket Pictures

Original release
- Network: YouTube
- Release: April 10 – May 1, 2017
- Network: Facebook Watch
- Release: November 30, 2018 – September 25, 2020

The Real Bros of Simi Valley is an American mockumentary television series based in Simi Valley, California. The satirical comedy both pays homage to and lampoons the culture of Southern California, and several stereotypes and tropes of unscripted reality shows, with hyperbolic emphasis on exaggerated dramatic elements, and canned infighting among the show's cast.

Jimmy Tatro and Christian A. Pierce co-created and executive produced the series and have written every episode. After directing season one with Michael J. Gallagher, Tatro directed every episode of seasons two and three. Tatro also stars alongside Nick Colletti, Tanner Petulla, and Cody Ko as the titular "Bros", with supporting cast members including Colleen Donovan, Peter Gilroy, Monette Moio, Monica Joy Shere, and Maddy Whitby. The series follows the lives of four friends ten years after their high school graduation.

The first season was released on YouTube and included four episodes. The second season was released November 30, 2018 on Facebook Watch. The third season was released on February 14, 2020. Other executive producers include Mike Rosenstein and Studio 71’s Dan Weinstein, Michael Schreiber, Adam Boorstin and Anjuli Hinds. The show is a parody of Jersey Shore and The Real Housewives. The series received a nomination at the 10th Shorty Awards for best web series.

The Real Bros of Simi Valley: The Movie film was released on July 4, 2024 on The Roku Channel.

== Episodes ==
=== Series overview ===
Season	Episodes	Originally released	
Season	Episodes	First released	Last released
1	4	April 10, 2017	May 1, 2017
2	10	November 30, 2018	February 1, 2019
3	11	February 14, 2020	September 25, 2020

=== Season 1 (2017) ===
No. overall	No. in season	Title	Directed by	Written by	Original release date
1	1	"Meet the Bros"	Michael J. Gallagher, Jimmy Tatro	Christian A. Pierce, Jimmy Tatro	April 10, 2017
2	2	"The Girls Are Back"	Michael J. Gallagher, Jimmy Tatro	Christian A. Pierce, Jimmy Tatro	April 17, 2017
3	3	"Squashing the Beef"	Michael J. Gallagher, Jimmy Tatro	Christian A. Pierce, Jimmy Tatro	April 24, 2017
4	4	"The Kickback"	Michael J. Gallagher, Jimmy Tatro	Christian A. Pierce, Jimmy Tatro	May 1, 2017

=== Season 2 (2018–19) ===
No. overall	No. in season	Title	Directed by	Written by	Original release date
5	1	"Final Straw"	Jimmy Tatro	Christian A. Pierce, Jimmy Tatro	November 30, 2018
6	2	"Obnoxiously Depressed"	Jimmy Tatro	Christian A. Pierce, Jimmy Tatro	December 7, 2018
7	3	"Under Yonder"	Jimmy Tatro	Christian A. Pierce, Jimmy Tatro	December 14, 2018
8	4	"The Simi Pro Am"	Jimmy Tatro	Christian A. Pierce, Jimmy Tatro	December 21, 2018
9	5	"Soul Patch Showdown"	Jimmy Tatro	Christian A. Pierce, Jimmy Tatro	December 28, 2018
10	6	"Open House"	Jimmy Tatro	Christian A. Pierce, Jimmy Tatro	January 4, 2019
11	7	"Leaving Simi"	Jimmy Tatro	Christian A. Pierce, Jimmy Tatro	January 11, 2019
12	8	"Lake Day"	Jimmy Tatro	Christian A. Pierce, Jimmy Tatro	January 18, 2019
13	9	"Dunc Surf"	Jimmy Tatro	Christian A. Pierce, Jimmy Tatro	January 25, 2019
14	10	"The Bro-Off"	Jimmy Tatro	Christian A. Pierce, Jimmy Tatro	February 1, 2019

=== Season 3 (2020) ===
No. overall	No. in season	Title	Directed by	Written by	Original release date
15	1	"Best Valentine's Day Ever"	Jimmy Tatro	Christian A. Pierce, Jimmy Tatro	February 14, 2020
16	2	"Feeling the Burn"	Jimmy Tatro	Christian A. Pierce, Jimmy Tatro	February 21, 2020
17	3	"Decaf Kush"	Jimmy Tatro	Christian A. Pierce, Jimmy Tatro	February 28, 2020
18	4	"Exes and Axes"	Jimmy Tatro	Christian A. Pierce, Jimmy Tatro	March 6, 2020
19	5	"Crushing Therapy"	Jimmy Tatro	Christian A. Pierce, Jimmy Tatro	March 13, 2020
20	6	"Back In High School"	Jimmy Tatro	Christian A. Pierce, Jimmy Tatro	March 20, 2020
21	7	"Sons of Xanarchy"	Jimmy Tatro	Christian A. Pierce, Jimmy Tatro	March 27, 2020
22	8	"Cabo"	Jimmy Tatro	Christian A. Pierce, Jimmy Tatro	September 4, 2020
23	9	"Lights Out Gringo"	Jimmy Tatro	Christian A. Pierce, Jimmy Tatro	September 11, 2020
24	10	"Full Fledged Rando"	Jimmy Tatro	Christian A. Pierce, Jimmy Tatro	September 18, 2020
25	11	"#XanTakesMolly"	Jimmy Tatro	Christian A. Pierce, Jimmy Tatro	September 25, 2020

== Cast and characters ==
=== Main ===
- Jimmy Tatro as Xander Hussein Sanders
- Nick Colletti as Duncan Surf
- Cody Ko as Wade Colonel Sanders
- Tanner Petulla as Bryce Meyer
- Colleen Donovan as Molly McShay
- Peter Gilroy as Johnny Johnny Mendez
- Monette Moio as Tessa Yamamoto
- Monica Joy Sherer as Lexy Luther
- Maddy Whitby as Dani (seasons 2–3)

=== Recurring ===
- Paul Thomas Arnold as Jeff Sanders
- Eric Walbridge as Brayson (seasons 1–2)
- Tennile Marie Goosic as Sam (season 1)
- Cara Santana as Andrea (season 2)
- Christine Cattell as Sandy Sanders (seasons 2–3)
- Christian A. Pierce as Aldis (seasons 2–3)
- Emmett and Wyatt Phillips as Hawk Sanders (season 2)
- Christopher McDonald as Cal Surf (seasons 2–3)
- Roman Galardi as Ethan (season 2)
- Lauren Elizabeth as Evonne (season 2)
- Pierson Fodé as Yonder (seasons 2–3)
- Oscar Miranda as Hector (season 2)
- Ego Nwodim as Brenda (season 2)
- Brandon Wardell as Brian (season 2)
- Kyle Herbert as Chris (season 2)
- Siddharth Dhananjay as Brinkman (season 2)
- Alice Lee as Chelsie (season 3)
- Hilty Bowen as Jenna (season 3)
- Brock O'Hurn as Keto (season 3)
- Victoria Justice as Courtney Ingles (season 3)
- Thomas Barbusca as a high schooler (season 3)
- Griffin Gluck as Aaron (season 3)
- Kyra Santoro as Kate Lipinski (season 3)

=== Guests ===
- Skyler Gisondo as Tyler (season 2)
- Nyjah Huston as himself (season 2)
- Natasha Leggero as Cheryl (season 2)
- Paul Scheer as Dr. Pissing (seasons 2–3)
- Tom Allen as Chad Kroeger (seasons 2–3)
- JT Parr as JT (season 3)
- Romanski as a Dunc Surf customer (season 3)
- Casey Frey as Tucker (season 3)
- Sean O'Bryan as Mark (season 3)
- Blue Kimble as Kane (season 3)
- Brock O'Hurn as Keto Creamer (season 3)
- Noel Miller as Mike Schaffer (season 3)
- Jay Chandrasekhar as Dr. Feel (season 3)
- Anwar Jibawi as a truck driver (season 3)
- King Bach as himself (season 3)
- Simon Rex as DJ Womp Womp (season 3)
- Pete Davidson as Grady (season 3)
