= Umanzor =

Umanzor is a surname. Notable people with the surname include:

- Deris Umanzor (born 1980), Salvadoran footballer
- Enya Umanzor (born 1999), American Podcaster and influencer
- Emilio Umanzor (born 1973), Honduran football coach
- Wendy Umanzor (born 1984), Honduran footballer
