= Jawline (film) =

- Film poster
- Directed by: Liza Mandelup
- Produced by: Bert Hamelinck; Sacha Ben Harroche; Hannah Reyer
- Starring: Michael Weist; Austyn Tester
- Cinematography: Noah Collier
- Edited by: Alex O'Flinn
- Music by: Palmbomen II
- Production company: Caviar
- Distributed by: Hulu
- Release date: January 2019 (Sundance)
- Running time: 99 minutes
- Country: United States
- Language: English

Jawline is a 2019 documentary film about social media and Internet celebrities. The documentary received several positive reviews. In February 2019, Hulu acquired United States distribution rights for the film. The film is directed by Liza Mandelup.

== Reception ==
On the review aggregator website Rotten Tomatoes, 97% of 30 critics' reviews are positive. The website's consensus reads: "Jawline uses one man's bid for online stardom to offer a compassionate, clear-eyed view of the risks and seductive allure of social media." On Metacritic, the film has a weighted average score of 74 out of 100 based on 10 critics, which the site labels as "generally favorable" reviews.
