= Michael Weist =

American producer and actor

Michael Gordon Weist III
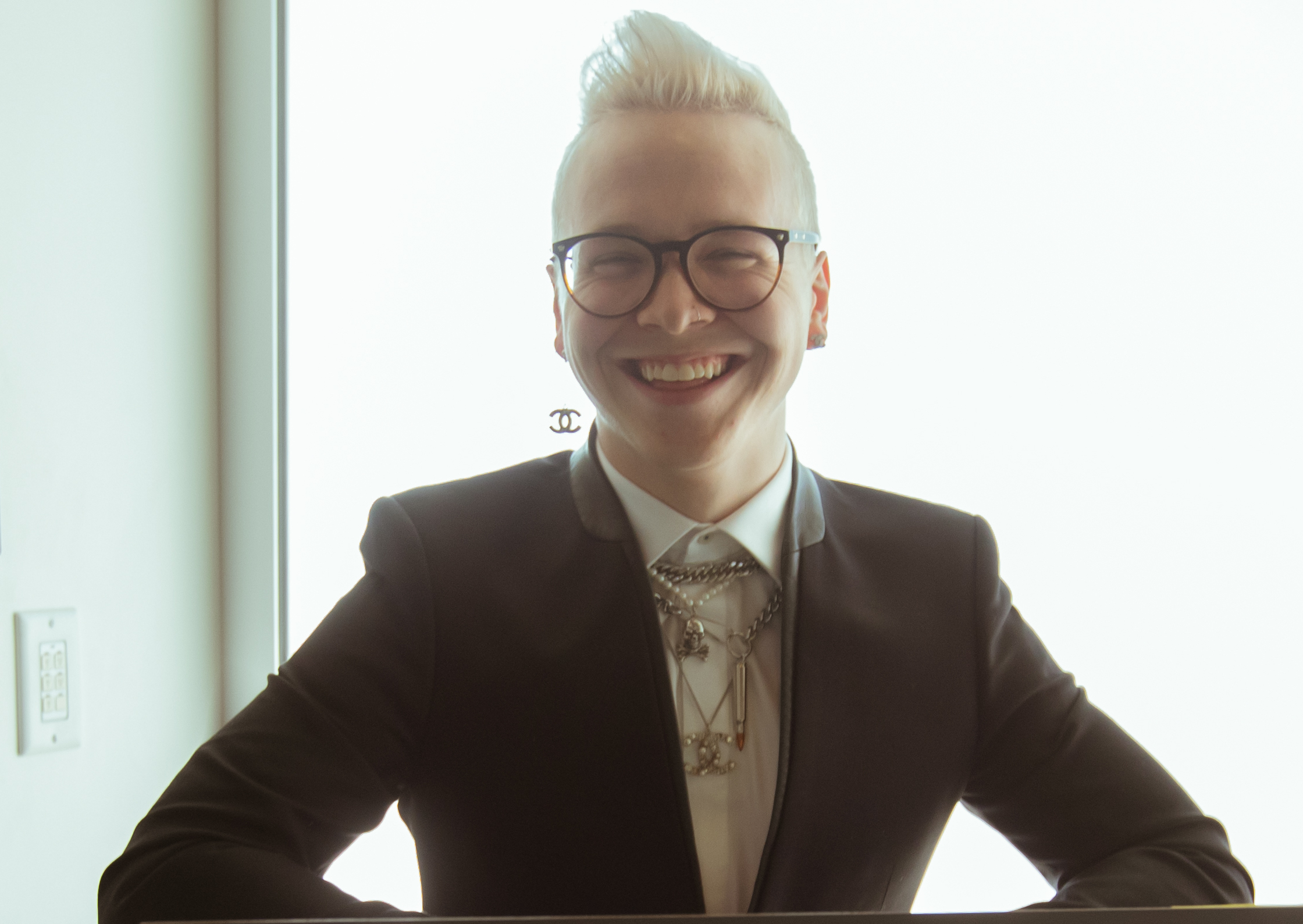
- Weist in 2019
- Born: July 25, 1996 (age 30)
- Education: Belmont University
- Occupations: Producer and actor
- Notable work: Jawline
- Website: michaelweist.com

Michael Gordon Weist III is an American talent manager, producer, actor, and entrepreneur known for his work in managing social media influencers and his involvement in several high-profile digital media projects. Weist gained significant attention for organizing TanaCon and for his appearance in the Hulu documentary Jawline, which played at the 2019 Sundance Film Festival.

Weist's television and movie work includes guest appearances on The Grammy Awards, The Kids Choice Awards, Amazon Prime, and Vice. Weist has worked with clients such as Kings of Leon, Bryce Hall, Tana Mongeau, Larray, Chris Hansen, and others.

== Early life ==
Michael Weist was born in Nashville, Tennessee. By the age of 16, he had worked as a DJ for the band Kings of Leon.

== Projects and career ==
=== TanaCon ===
At 17, Weist founded Good Times Entertainment, a talent management company that worked with digital content creators and influencers. The company quickly became known for its innovative approach to managing online personalities. Weist also created Good Times TV, a video streaming platform aimed at showcasing content from his managed talent.

However, Weist's most notable project under Good Times Entertainment was the organization of TanaCon in 2018, a convention created in collaboration with YouTuber Tana Mongeau as an alternative to VidCon. The event, which featured guests like Shane Dawson, Bella Thorne, Casey Neistat, and David Dobrik, was canceled within hours due to overcrowding and safety concerns. The fallout from TanaCon was widely covered in the media, and Weist later filed for Chapter 7 bankruptcy and dissolved his company Good Times Entertainment, claiming a loss of $700,000 due to the event.

=== SwerV records ===
In 2014, Weist launched SwerV Records, a record label designed to promote music created by social media influencers. One of the label's most successful projects was the release of tracks by influencer Larray, including "First Place" and "Last Place." "First Place" became particularly popular, spending 42 weeks on Billboard’s Comedy Digital Tracks chart and gaining over 55 million views on YouTube; ranking at number 13 on the 2018 year-end chart.

=== Juice Krate Media Group ===
In 2019, Weist founded Juice Krate Media Group, where he served as president and CEO. Juice Krate focused on the management, monetization, and branding of influencers, providing services that included merchandise and event planning. The company played a significant role in shaping the careers of several digital content creators and further established Weist's influence in the entertainment industry.

== Personal life ==
Weist is gay.

In 2017 Weist filed a defamation lawsuit against former clients, Bryce Hall and Mikey Barone, which was briefly depicted in the documentary Jawline. The case settled in 2018.
