= Elijah Daniel =

American internet personality (born 1994)

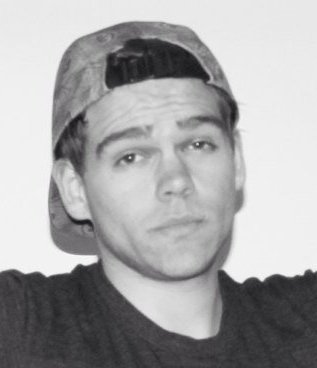
- Daniel in 2014
- Born: January 9, 1994 (age 32); Detroit, Michigan, U.S.
- Occupation: Comedian
- Years active: 2011–present
- Known for: Trump Temptations (2016)
- Musical career
- Genre: Hip hop
- Instrument: Vocals
- Label: Independent

Elijah Daniel (born January 9, 1994) is an American comedian, rapper, record producer, songwriter, and author. He became popular online through his satirical social media posts. Daniel began rapping under the name Lil Phag in late 2017.

Daniel rose to prominence as the author of the erotic novel Trump Temptations.

Outside of his solo work, Daniel is a part of the EDM/Pop act adam&steve alongside fiancé, Dr. Woke. Billboard has dubbed the duo "the gay Chainsmokers". They have since released six singles featuring Maty Noyes, Sophie Rose, Gnash, JVZEL, XYLØ, and Waterparks.

He won the award for Best Comedian with collaborator Christine Sydelko at the 9th Shorty Awards.

== Early life ==
Elijah Daniel was born in Detroit, Michigan. He was raised as an evangelical Christian. After his grandmother became ill, Daniel moved into her residence to care for her. During this period, he began to write comedy to occupy himself. He publicized his comedy work through posts on Twitter.

== Career ==
=== 2013–2016: Career beginnings ===
White House petition

Daniel led an online White House petition in 2013 to make the Miley Cyrus song "Party in the U.S.A." the U.S. national anthem. It received international coverage. Starting in 2014, he began hosting a weekly internet prank with CollegeHumor called Text Prank Thursday, where he would have his Twitter followers text random phone numbers saying whatever he told them to say. Daniel told Vice that he cultivated a group of followers online who appreciated his absurd and bizarre comedic antics. By 2016, his Twitter following had grown to over 95,000.

Work with Christine Sydelko

In January 2017, Daniel and Christine Sydelko released a parody video of the song "Closer" originally by The Chainsmokers, featuring Halsey. The video prompted a response from Halsey, who criticized the parody and Daniel and Sydelko's supporters.

Television pilots

Based on the press he received for his book, Daniel was able to sell two TV series proposals. In conjunction with production firm PRØHBTD, Daniel was given roles of actor, producer, and creator of the two series. These included one docu-series titled Elijah Daniel is Insane, and one scripted comedy titled Social co-starring Vine comedian Christine Sydelko. In October 2016, FOTV Media Networks Inc. announced a business partnership with Daniel and Sydelko to produce a full season of their series Trash, Talking.

=== 2016–2018: Political stunts and media attention ===
Trump Temptations

In 2016, Daniel stated on Twitter that he was going to get drunk and write an erotic novel starring Donald Trump. Daniel was inspired by a tweet which said the user wished to perform a sex act on Bernie Sanders. He wrote the work as a parody of Fifty Shades of Grey. Within four hours, he had released the erotic novel titled Trump Temptations: The Billionaire & The Bellboy on Amazon. This was Daniel's debut novel.

Trump Temptations became the number one best seller on Amazon.com in three categories: humorous erotica, LGBT erotica, and gay erotica. The book was listed on Amazon above Fifty Shades of Grey by E. L. James, and was featured in The Washington Post, Los Angeles Times, GQ, Gay Star News, London Evening Standard, The Daily Telegraph, and Vice. The Guardian classed the work as part of the "small but burgeoning new genre: satirical books about Donald Trump" that began with the 2016 presidential campaign. Cosmopolitan called the book a literary success. Daniel's book attracted 900,000 readers on the Wattpad website. Daniel hired Trump impersonator Chris Ferretti to read the audiobook.

In May 2016, Daniel negotiated a rights deal with film studio NakedSword to turn his novel into a feature film. They began adapting the story in 2016. NakedSword stated they were interested in the project due to the absurd nature of the plot. Trump biographer Marc Shapiro wrote in Trump This! that Daniel's novel was one of the most infamous works capitalizing on interest in Trump. An article in Fortune said that Daniel displayed a Trump-like skill to capitalize on a niche demand.

Hell, Michigan

On August 30, 2017, Elijah Daniel performed a publicity stunt centered around Hell, Michigan – an unincorporated town that allows visitors to pay for the opportunity to hold the title of "mayor" for a day. In what he called "a copy-and-paste of Trump's Muslim ban", he announced a satirical law that banned heterosexuals from entering and living in the town. In response, Daniel released an edited version of The Bible called The Holy Bible... but Gayer two weeks later. Sales of it were briefly banned on Amazon before being restored. On June 17, 2019, Elijah Daniel claimed that he briefly "bought" the incorporated hamlet of Hell, Michigan, changed its name to Gay Hell, Michigan and created a law prohibiting any flag other than pride flags from flying in the town. This was done in retaliation to the Trump administration's ban on the flying of the gay pride flag by U.S. embassies.

Television

In November 2017, Daniel, Christine Sydelko, and Tana Mongeau appeared on a segment of The Maury Povich Show. In this segment, Christine and Daniel pretended to be engaged, him proposing to her at Taco Bell. Christine feared Daniel was cheating on her with Mongeau, but Daniel's lie detector results revealed he was actually cheating on her with men.

=== 2019–present: Music ===
Since 2017, Daniel has been releasing hip-hop music under the stage name Lil Phag. He has released two extended plays and one studio album under the moniker, as well as a slew of singles featuring artists including Cupcakke, Bella Thorne, Tana Mongeau, and Dr. Woke, the latter of whom produced most of his music. The pair have since gone on to pursue their own musical project, Adam&Steve, which has a more EDM sound.

== Personal life ==
Daniel is gay.

=== LGBT advocacy ===
After the Orlando nightclub shooting in June 2016, Daniel on Twitter publicly urged any closeted people to feel free to contact him privately for support, and he published "An open letter to the LGBT kids who feel lost and scared" on Fusion.net. The letter was positively received by ATTN:, which called it a powerful commentary on the attack.

After receiving homophobic death threats via Twitter, in July 2016 Daniel messaged someone he believed to be the parents of the user about the incident and publicly posted a screenshot of his message to them. His response was praised by Metro News and Elite Daily.

In 2021, Daniel started a virtual restaurant called GayBurger, a viral marketing campaign to raise money for the Los Angeles LGBT Center.

=== Legal issues ===
On February 23, 2016, Daniel was detained and question by the United States Secret service, while attending a Donald Trump campaign rally in Sparks, Nevada. Daniel had been hiding a "2-foot glittery pink dildo" in his pants, in hopes to throw the object at Trump during the rally. He was released without arrest, however was barred from attending any further Trump rallies.

== Reception ==
Elijah Daniel and Christine Sydelko jointly won Best Comedian from the Shorty Awards in 2017. Daniel received positive reception for his comedy posted via video blogging and social media from Heavy.com, Paper, The Washington Post, and The Daily Dot.

== Discography ==
=== Studio albums ===
- God Hates Lil Phag (2018)

=== Extended plays ===
- ResErection (2019)
- Antichrist (2019)
- The Final Album (2019) No. 138 US

=== Singles ===
As lead artist

Title	Year	Album
"Phaggot"	2017	God Hates Lil Phag
"Elton John" (with Hoodie Allen and Dr. Woke)	2017	God Hates Lil Phag
"Gucci Christmas" (with Dr. Woke)	2017	Non-album single
"Deadahh" (with Tana Mongeau and Dr. Woke)	2017	God Hates Lil Phag
"Phucked Ur Dad"	2017	Non-album single
"Clout 9" (with Bella Thorne, Tana Mongeau and Dr. Woke)	2018	God Hates Lil Phag
":)" (with Mod Sun and Dr. Woke)	2018	God Hates Lil Phag
"Rick and Morty" (with Rico Nasty and Dr. Woke)	2018	God Hates Lil Phag
"3AM Anxiety" (with Dr. Woke)	2018	God Hates Lil Phag
"Iced Out Dick" (with Cupcakke and Dr. Woke)	2018	God Hates Lil Phag
"Third Eye Gucci" (with Dr. Woke)	2018	Non-album single
"It's My Money, and I Need It Now" (with Dr. Woke)	2018	God Hates Lil Phag
"ErrybodyGay" (with Dr. Woke featuring Lil B and Baha Bla$t)	2019	ResErection
"F*ckGod" (featuring S8N)	2019	Antichrist

== Filmography ==
=== Film ===
Year	Title	Role	Director	Notes
2014	Lost River	Actor: Big Bad Wolf Club Member	Ryan Gosling	
2014	Happy Ending	Actor: Lonely Guy Texting At The Bar / Pedestrian	Krishna D.K., Raj Nidimoru	
2017	Division 19	Actor: Pedestrian	S.A. Halewood	

=== Television ===
Year	Title	Role	Notes
2013	Low Winter Sun	Actor: Concession Stand Boy	Episodes 8 and 9, Season 1
2015	12 Monkeys	Actor: Survivor	Pilot episode
2016	DSN: Drunk Shopping Network	Himself	Episode #1.16
2016	Givit Wednesday	Producer, writer, editor, actor	Givit.com
2016	Trash, Talking	Producer, writer	FOTV Media Networks Inc.

=== Music videos ===
Year	Title	Artist	Director	Notes
2013	"Badman"	B.A.P	Hong Won-ki of ZanyBros	
2017	"Bing Bong" ("Closer" parody)	Elijah Daniel & Christine Sydelko	Tom Harlock	
2017	"Young Dumb & Broke"	Khalid		

== Tours ==
Headlining

- Probably A Terrible Rap Matinee Tour (2018) (with Dr. Woke)
- The Final Tour: First Installment (2020) (with Dr. Woke)

== Awards and nominations ==
Year	Award	Category	Work	Result	Notes
2017	Shorty Awards	Best Comedian	Elijah Daniel & Christine Sydelko – Winner in Comedy	Won	

== See also ==
- List of LGBT YouTubers
- List of YouTubers
