= Who TF Did I Marry? =

Series of 2024 TikTok videos by Reesa Teesa

Who TF Did I Marry? (short for Who the Fuck Did I Marry?) is a series of 50 TikTok videos posted by user Tareasa Johnson, known online as ReesaTeesa, in February 2024. In them, she chronicles her relationship and marriage to a man whom she calls "Legion" and describes as a pathological liar who, unbeknownst to her, falsified the majority of details about his life. The series quickly went viral online, earning praise from social media users and critics for Johnson's storytelling skills and prompting a response from her ex-husband. It is scheduled to be made into a television series, starring and executive produced by Natasha Rothwell.

== Background and synopsis ==
Tareasa Michele Johnson, a then-39-year-old Atlanta-based law enforcement worker known as ReesaTeesa or @reesamteesa on TikTok, posted a series of videos on the platform from February 14, 2024, to February 17, 2024, about her ex-husband. She referred to him in the series pseudonymously as "Legion" based on the Biblical demons of the same name, though social media users eventually identified him. Her first video was captioned "Things My Pathologically Lying Ex-Husband Lied About". In it and the following 49 videos in the series, each of which are ten minutes long and which are collectively over eight hours long, she outlines their relationship and her husband's lies about his life.

According to Johnson, the two matched on both Facebook Dating and on Hinge in March 2020, two weeks before the COVID-19 pandemic began. On the way to their first date, Johnson's tire blew out and he paid for it to be repaired as well as for the date itself, and later shared with her that he was financially successful due to his past as an arena football player at San Diego State University. He stated that he had moved from California, where he said he worked at Apple, to Atlanta to work as the vice president at a condiment company. During the date, he claimed that his first wife had cheated on him and that they had recently divorced. Two weeks later, the pair moved in together to quarantine. The following month, they discussed purchasing a $700k home as well as a car together, but both plans fell through (under then-unclear circumstances). Johnson became pregnant around this time, but would end up miscarrying and being driven to the hospital by a coworker when Legion said he could not drive her.

The two got married in January 2021 before she learned that he had lied about most details of his life, including that he was actually working as a forklift driver for a temp agency; that he pretended to be on the phone every day calling relatives, friends, and Realtors despite not actually ever being on a call; that he needed money for his step-daughter's funeral despite her not having died; that he had never attended San Diego State University; that he had been using fake Social Security numbers; and that he falsified documents from Chase Bank, including a pre-approval for a $700,000 mortgage. She also found out that he had previously been criminally charged with impersonating a police officer and trespassing and was on probation. When Johnson got a new job, she did a background check on Legion that allowed her to track down his family, including his ex-wife, LaToya Averett, who divorced him in 2017, and his twin brother, whom he allegedly borrowed many of the details of his false life from and who told Johnson that her husband had been diagnosed with schizophrenia and bipolar disorder. According to Johnson, his family had all cut contact with him due to his pathological lying. After she kicked him out of her house on his birthday in June 2021, he attempted to return to the house two months later, prompting Reesa Teesa to call the police on him.

== Reception and impact ==
Who TF Did I Marry quickly went viral online, earning over 500 million views in total by March 2025, with ReesaTeesa gaining over three million followers within two weeks of posting the series and signing to Creative Artists Agency in March 2024. In February 2024, Johnson denied claims that she had earned hundreds of thousands of dollars from the virality of the series, stating that she had not been a part of TikTok's Creator Fund when she first started posting it and that, after joining it, she had been suspended from it for attempting to reupload videos in the series and was therefore still not earning money from it. She stated in March 2024 that she had earned five thousand dollars from the videos altogether. She began selling t-shirts with slogans from the series, such as "proof of funds" and "I survived Legion", in collaboration with Etsy seller Designs by Allicia that month as well. Other Etsy sellers sold unauthorized merchandise such as t-shirts and water bottles with phrases from her videos. Throughout 2024, she appeared on Good Morning America, on Tamron Hall, and as a commencement speaker at the University at Buffalo.

Glamour's Stephanie McNeal attributed the series' success to Reesa Teesa being a "master storyteller" who relayed her story with "confidence and focus". For USA Today, Mary Walrath-Holdrige wrote that the series attracted a cult following and wrote that its story, which she called "Lifetime movie-esque", made Legion "one of the most hated online characters of 2024". Moises Mendez II, for Time, praised Johnson as a "compelling ... storyteller" who had an "attention to detail", also writing, "Who TF Did I Marry? stands out thanks to Reesa Teesa and the way she keeps viewers engaged." Angelina Chapin of The Cut deemed Johnson a "folk hero for scorned women" who was "funny" and "speaks in memeable catchphrases" and wrote that Who TF Did I Marry? was "plot-driven and bingeable, more voyeuristic than reality TV, and totally unstaged". Amanda Hess of The New York Times called Who TF Did I Marry? "perhaps the first blockbuster of TikTok's middle-aged era", describing it as catering to aging millennials on TikTok. Critics also compared Who TF Did I Marry? to a viral 2015 Twitter thread by A'Ziah "Zola" King, which was later adapted into the 2021 film Zola.

After the series went viral, a man claiming to be Johnson's husband came forward on TikTok to dispute Johnson's story, alleging instead that she had cheated on him with a man named Bradley and that they had divorced after attempts at marriage counseling failed. Comments on his videos were largely negative. By August 2024, the series inspired several other longform-style series on TikTok by influencers such as Brooke Schofield, Madeline Argy, Chris Olsen, and Haley Kalil detailing relationships with people who lied.

=== Television adaptation ===
A television adaptation of Who TF Did I Marry was announced in September 2024. Johnson is scheduled to be played by Natasha Rothwell, who acquired the rights to the series through her Big Hattie Productions company and is also scheduled to executive produce the series.
