= Tana Mongeau =

American Internet personality (born 1998)

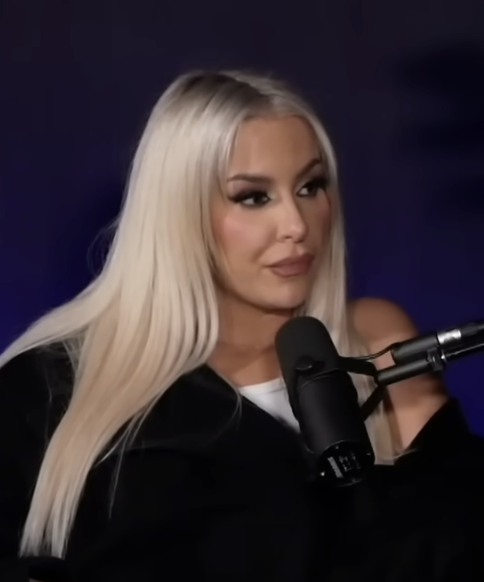
- Mongeau in 2024
- Born: Tana Marie Mongeau; June 24, 1998 (age 28); Henderson, Nevada, U.S.
- Occupations: Internet personality; YouTuber; podcaster
- Partner: Makoa Da Silva (2023–present)

YouTube information
- Channels: Tana Mongeau; Not Loveline with Tana and Trish; Brand Safe
- Years active: 2015–present
- Subscribers: 5.52 million (main channel); 2.42 million (Cancelled); 232 thousand (Not Loveline)
- Views: 968 million (main channel); 171 million (Cancelled); 22 million (Not Loveline)
- Last updated: June 9, 2026

Tana Marie Mongeau (/ˈtænə ˈmoʊʒoʊ/ TAN-ə MOH-zhoh; born June 24, 1998) is an American internet personality. She first rose to prominence as a teenager, posting unfiltered "storytime" videos to her YouTube channel. She has since branched out into other media, including her podcasts Cancelled with Tana Mongeau & Brooke Schofield, Not Loveline with Tana and Trish, and Brand Safe. Her YouTube channels have collectively garnered more than 1 billion views.

== Early life ==
Tana Mongeau was born on June 24, 1998, to Rick and Rebecca Mongeau in Henderson, Nevada, where she was raised. Mongeau attended Green Valley High School before dropping out during her sophomore year. While on MTV No Filter: Tana Turns 21, Tana said that her parents lacked parenting skills which caused her to have a strained childhood. On her podcast with Brooke Schofield, she also stated "I spent my whole life feeling like I was raising [them]". She is not on speaking terms with her biological family and has stated numerous times that she was adopted by her best friend's family at age thirteen.

== Career ==
Mongeau's rose to prominence as a teenage YouTuber for her unfiltered "storytime" videos. On February 10, 2017, Mongeau posted on her Snapchat that she was being investigated by the FBI after someone hacked into her emails and "sent a bombing and shooting threat to McCarran International Airport." In November 2017, Mongeau was featured on a sketch posted to the Maury YouTube channel. Her video collaborations with other social media personalities such as Shane Dawson, Jeffree Star, Jake Paul, Bella Thorne, David Dobrick, Sidemen, James Charles, and Niki and Gabi have garnered tens of millions of views.

Her MTV reality series titled MTV No Filter: Tana Turns 21 premiered Summer 2019.

Mongeau launched the Cancelled podcast on July 26, 2021. Originally led by Mongeau, Hunter Moreno, and Brooke Schofield, Moreno soon left the podcast, and Mongeau and Schofield hosted it together. The podcast covered pop culture as well as Mongeau's and Schofield's personal lives, often bringing in guests to provide their own thoughts and experiences. The podcast ended in 2025 after 130 episodes.

On January 26, 2022, Mongeau launched her own wine brand Dizzy Wine.

Mongeau hosts the podcasts Brand Safe and, with co-host Trisha Paytas, Not Loveline with Tana and Trish. She has also appeared on podcasts such as Call Her Daddy and Therapuss with Jake Shane.

=== Music ===
Mongeau's debut single, "Hefner", was released in November 2017. The music video featured Bella Thorne. Mongeau collaborated with Lil Phag and Dr. Woke on a song titled "Deadahh" that was released on December 15, 2017. She released her second solo single, "W", on March 1, 2018. Her third solo single, "Fuck Up", was released on August 31, 2018.

Mongeau's fourth solo single, "FaceTime", was released on May 18, 2019, alongside its music video. On April 22, 2020, Mongeau released her fifth solo single, "Without You".

=== Controversies ===
==== "The N Word" ====
On January 24, 2017, Mongeau posted a video titled "The N Word" which has received over 7 million views. In the video, she describes an encounter where a person on her tour (later revealed to be YouTuber iDubbbz) told her "say nigger" in response to a tweet posted by Mongeau to iDubbbz, telling him to kill himself for his comedic use of the word in his YouTube videos. In retaliation, iDubbbz made a video exposing her hypocrisy by pointing out examples in which Mongeau used the slur herself. On February 17, 2017, Mongeau posted a video in which she apologized for using the word. In May 2023, iDubbbz released a video apologizing for his past actions, which included a direct apology to Mongeau for his actions towards her.

==== TanaCon ====
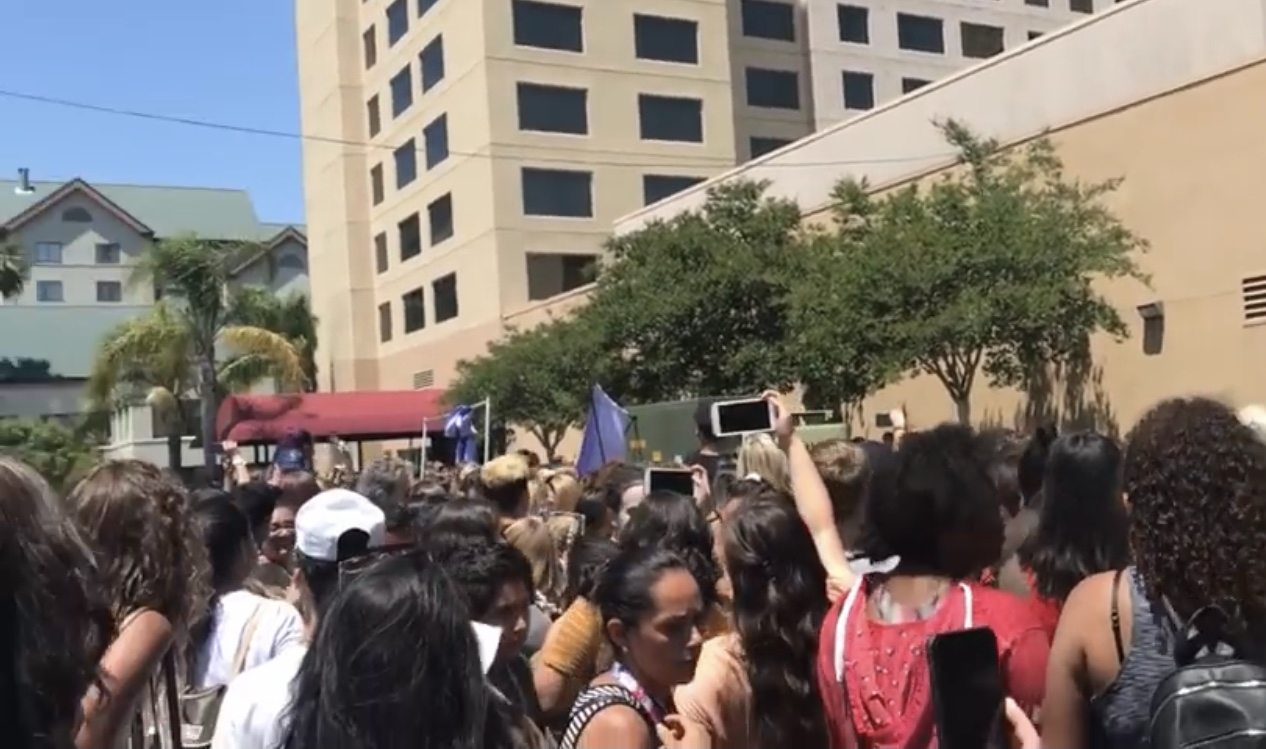
A crowd outside TanaCon

On May 26, 2018, Mongeau announced that she would be hosting a convention named TanaCon from June 22 to 23, 2018, in Anaheim, California. This was a reaction to Vidcon 2017 organizers declining to give Mongeau the rights of a "featured creator" at their event. Mongeau scheduled TanaCon at the same time and in the same city as VidCon 2018, and intended her convention to be an alternative to it. TanaCon was organized in collaboration with manager Michael Weist.

The convention began at the Anaheim Marriott Suites on June 22, but was canceled the same day. Over 80 creators were set to hold panels at the event, including Bella Thorne, Shane Dawson, Casey Neistat, Miranda Sings, Ricky Dillon, Elijah Daniel, Jenn McAllister, Gabbie Hanna, Trevi Moran, Lisa Schwartz, and Jack Baran. Despite Mongeau's claims that 20,000 people tried to come to the convention – a number greater than the Marriott's capacity – only 4,000 to 5,000 attended. Those who attended or lined up to do so complained of a lack of food and water and of standing for hours in the sun. It was reported that many people were sunburned and that some passed out because of the heat.

The event has received much attention and criticism. The Verge said that fans were comparing it to Fyre Festival, and attendees were yelling "refund" after the event. Mongeau later apologized and said that refunds would be issued. Shortly after TanaCon, Dawson released on YouTube a three-part documentary series examining the failure of the event.

In May 2019, VidCon said that Mongeau would be a featured creator at the convention due to VidCon cofounder Hank Green in 2018 expressing regrets and stating that he had "100% screwed up" in not inviting Mongeau to VidCon 2017 as a featured creator.

==== Brooke Schofield Tweets ====
In August 2024, Cancelled co-host Brooke Schofield came under fire for numerous screenshots of resurfaced tweets. A post depicting her thoughts on the killing of Trayvon Martin in 2020 was at the center of controversy, reading, "Guarantee if Zimmerman shot a white guy this wouldn't even be a story. NEWS FLASH THIS WASN'T A CRIME OF RACISM IT WAS SELF DEFENSE". Mongeau called Schofield's posts "fucked-up" and "horrific", but she did not remove her as co-host. She also announced she would donate proceeds from the podcast and her TikTok content to the Trayvon Martin Foundation.

== Personal life ==
Mongeau is bisexual. At the start of her YouTube career, she was in a relationship with Somer Hollingsworth, featuring him in many of her vlogs before they broke up in June 2017. After that, Mongeau was in a relationship with Bella Thorne from 2017 to February 2019, including a period in which she, Thorne, and singer Mod Sun were a throuple. She also had on-and-off relationships with rappers Lil Xan and Chris Miles. Thorne, Mod Sun, Lil Xan, and Miles have released songs about their relationships with Mongeau.

Mongeau began dating social media personality Jake Paul in April 2019. In June 2019, the couple announced that they were engaged, although many fans and commentators did not believe the engagement was legitimate. On July 28 of that year, Paul and Mongeau exchanged vows in Las Vegas. InTouch later reported that the couple did not obtain a marriage license and the officiant was not licensed by the state of Nevada. As a result, the marriage was not legally binding. BuzzFeed reported that Paul and Mongeau left the ceremony separately. The ceremony, which was available on pay-per-view for $50, was recorded for MTV No Filter: Tana Turns 21. On an episode of the show, Mongeau stated that the ceremony was something "fun and lighthearted that we're obviously doing for fun and for content." The couple announced their breakup in January 2020.

In May 2024, Mongeau stated on Cancelled that she and YouTuber Cody Ko had sex when she was 17 and he was 25, which would be illegal under Florida law where sex between someone under 18 and someone over 24 is categorized as statutory rape. The allegations were covered by Rolling Stone in June and gained attention upon being covered by YouTuber D'Angelo Wallace in July, with no immediate comment by Ko. Other social media personalities like Jarvis Johnson, Brittany Broski, MoistCr1tikal, Hasan Piker, and I Did a Thing condemned Ko's actions. Ko stepped down from day-to-day operations at his podcast network Tiny Meat Gang Studios, and his YouTube channel lost 250,000 subscribers in 30 days.

Mongeau is sober. She has been in a relationship with Makoa Da Silva since 2023. She is friends with actresses Chelsea Handler and Trisha Paytas.

== Discography ==
=== Singles ===
==== As lead artist ====
Title	Year	Album
"Hefner"	2017	Non-album single
"Deadahh" (with Lil Phag and Dr. Woke)	2017	God Hates Lil Phag
"W"	2018	non-album singles
"Fuck Up"	2018	non-album singles
"FaceTime"	2019	non-album singles
"Without You"	2020	non-album singles

==== As featured artist ====
Title	Year	Album
"Clout 9" (Lil Phag featuring Bella Thorne, Tana Mongeau, and Dr. Woke)	2018	God Hates Lil Phag

=== Guest appearances ===
Title (Note: List of non-single guest appearances.)	Year	Album
"Four Loko" (Lil Phag featuring Tana Mongeau and Dr. Woke)	2018	God Hates Lil Phag

== Filmography ==
Year	Title	Role	Notes
2016–2017	Shane and Friends	Herself	Guest star; 4 episodes
2017, 2019	Escape the Night	Saloon Girl / The Pin-Up Girl	Main role (seasons 2 & 4)
2019–2020	No Filter: Tana Mongeau	Herself	Lead role
2025	Escape the Night: The Lost Tapes	The Prom Queen	Main role

== Awards and nominations ==
Year	Award	Category	Nominated work	Result	Ref.
2018	10th Shorty Awards	Best YouTube Comedian	Herself	Nominated	
2018	8th Streamy Awards	Storyteller	Herself	Nominated	
2019	11th Shorty Awards	YouTuber of the Year	Herself	Nominated	
2019	45th People's Choice Awards	The Social Star of 2019	Herself	Nominated	
2019	9th Streamy Awards	Creator of the Year	Herself	Won	
2019	9th Streamy Awards	Best Ensemble Cast	Escape the Night	Nominated	
