= Brooke Schofield =

American Internet personality (born 1996)

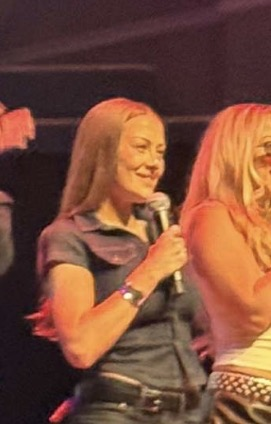
- Schofield in 2025
- Born: November 26, 1996 (age 29); Chandler, Arizona, United States
- Education: University of Arizona
- Occupations: Podcaster; TikToker; YouTuber
- Years active: 2019–present
- Known for: Cancelled
- Spouse: Miles Canton (m. 2026)

Instagram information
- Page: Brooke Schofield
- Followers: 837,000 (April 2026)

TikTok information
- Page: Brooke Schofield
- Followers: 1.9 million (December 2025)

YouTube information
- Channel: Brooke Schofield
- Subscribers: 227,000 (April 2026)
- Views: 16.4 million (April 2026)

Brooke Amber Schofield (born November 26, 1996) is an American internet personality and podcaster. She is best known for co-hosting the podcast Cancelled (2021–2025) alongside Tana Mongeau and hosting the Big Feelings podcast (2026–present).

== Early life ==
Brooke Schofield was born on November 26, 1996. According to Schofield, her mother was a drug addict, and she was adopted by her conservative grandparents when she was 10 years old. She attended the University of Arizona, where she studied nursing and was in a sorority. She dropped out her third year, stating that she frequently cheated on her exams, and, inspired by the 2017 musical film The Greatest Showman, moved to Los Angeles in 2018 to become an actress.

== Career ==
Schofield appeared in the films Hook, Line, Sinker and Leave Him in the Dust in 2019. She then worked as a waitress for three years to fund auditions. After being fired from Catch LA during the COVID-19 pandemic, she became close friends with influencer Tana Mongeau, whom she met at a party. The two began co-hosting the weekly podcast Cancelled in July 2021, where they gossip about celebrities and discuss their personal lives. Schofield often talks about her relationships on the podcast. The duo went on tour in 2023 and again from February to July 2024. In August 2024, Schofield collaborated with clothing brand Boys Lie on a capsule collection called Bless His Heart. Schofield and Mongeau completed their national Cancelled Cross Country tour from which ran from September to October 2024.

== Personal life ==
Schofield was in a brief relationship with singer-songwriter Clinton Kane in 2021. In 2024, Schofield responded to a TikTok video by Kane, which he captioned, "When you've been over the relationship for 2 years but she won’t stop yapping," with a 14-part video series in which she alleged that he had lied about his parents and brother dying, his nationality being Australian, and his age. She also accused him of cheating on her multiple times. The series, which was inspired by TikTok user Reesa Teesa's Who TF Did I Marry? series on the platform, went viral online and inspired other creators to post similar video series. Kane responded with his own multi-part TikTok series titled "Who Did I Date Not Marry", while his representative refuted Schofield's claims to Rolling Stone and People. She was also in a relationship with comedian Matt Rife starting at the beginning of 2023, whom she later accused of body shaming and love bombing her. In June 2025, Schofield announced via Instagram that she was engaged to her boyfriend Miles Canton, son of film producer Neil Canton.

In August of 2024, Schofield became the center of controversy when screenshots resurfaced of old tweets she had written in which she had expressed racially insensitive views, especially with regards to the killing of Trayvon Martin in 2012. Schofield issued an apology and took a short hiatus from the Cancelled Podcast.

Schofield married her partner Miles McFly, whose birth name is Miles Canton, in March 2026. McFly, is the son of Neil Canton who is known for his work on the Back to the Future franchise.
