= Kyra Santoro =

American model

- Born: Kyra Savannah Santoro; March 22, 1993 (age 32); Los Angeles, CA
- Occupations: actress, model, author and singer
- Years active: 2011-present
- Modeling information
- Height: 173 cm (5 ft 8 in)
- Hair color: Brown
- Eye color: Brown
- Agency: Select Model Management

Kyra Savannah Santoro (born March 22, 1993) is an actress, model, author and singer. She was born in Los Angeles, California.

== Career ==
She grew up doing commercial work as a child. In 2012 she was named Miss Transworld surf. She has shot for publications such as Sports Illustrated in 2016, Maxim US and Mexico, Bella Mag, Men's Health and GQ.

In 2017 Santoro acted for Fox's The Orville. She has appeared on seasons 1–3 as Ensign Turco. In 2020 she was in The Real Bros of Simi Valley. In May 2023 she published a poetry book titled “Be gentle my heart is in here.” In 2024 she starred in a movie called Model House as Nadia. In 2024 she appeared in an episode of the Ryan Murphy production 9-1-1. She started releasing music in early 2019 with an EP titled 3:23.

== Personal life ==
In 2016, she was linked to actor Taylor Lautner. The pair was rumored to have dated for a few months before breaking things off.

== Filmography ==
=== Film ===
Year	Title	Role	Notes
2024	Model House	Nadia	
2024	The Slumber Party	Alexis Gabriel	television film
2016	Organics	Sid	Short

=== Television ===
Year	Title	Role	Notes
2024	9-1-1	Carrie	S8E8
2017-2022	The Orville	Ensign Jenny Turco	10 episodes
2020	The Real Bros of Simi Valley	Kate Lipinski	S3.E10
