= Cody Ko =

Canadian Internet personality (born 1990)

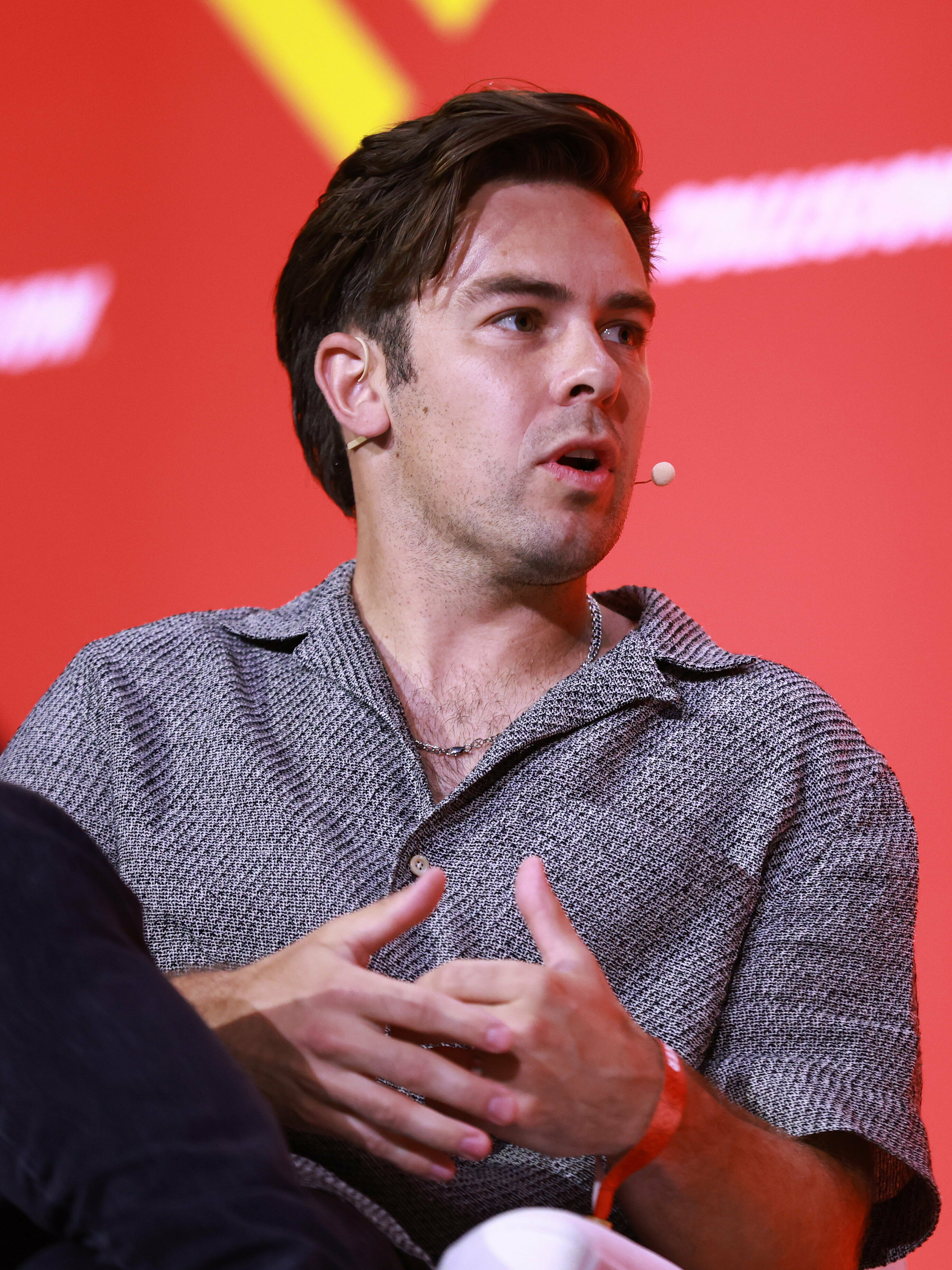
- Ko in June 2023
- Born: Cody Michael Kolodziejzyk; 22 November 1990 (age 35); Calgary, Alberta, Canada
- Education: Duke University (BA)
- Occupations: YouTuber; podcaster; comedian; rapper
- Spouse: Kelsey Kreppel (m. 2023)
- Children: 1
- Relatives: Greg Kolodziejzyk (father)

YouTube information
- Channel: Cody Ko
- Genres: Commentary; comedy
- Subscribers: 5.42 million
- Views: 1.58 billion
- Musical career
- Genre: Hip hop
- Years active: 2017–present
- Label: Arista
- Formerly of: Tiny Meat Gang
- Last updated: 29 May 2026

Cody Michael Kolodziejzyk (born 22 November 1990; /ˌkɔːləˈdʒɛ.sɪk/ kaw-lə-JEH-sik, Polish: [kɔwɔˈd͡ʑɛjt͡ʂɨk]), better known as Cody Ko, is a Canadian YouTuber, podcaster, comedian, and rapper. His style of content is often crudely comedic and profane. (Note: Robison (2021): "often-crude videos involving silly bits with friends, sexual innuendo, and jokes about internet culture" Emmanuele (2015): "(and often profane)") As of April 2023, his five YouTube channels have collectively earned over 9.37 million subscribers and 1.86 billion views.

After majoring in computer science at Duke University, Ko worked as a mobile developer and began making Vines, garnering almost 2 million followers on Vine before the social media platform closed in 2017. He shifted to uploading commentary and reaction videos to YouTube, where he and fellow YouTuber Noel Miller became popular with their reaction series That's Cringe and the Tiny Meat Gang Podcast. They also began a comedy hip hop group called Tiny Meat Gang.

In 2019, influencer Jake Paul was criticized for accusing Ko of cyberbullying in his commentary videos, inadvertently causing Ko to gain 140,000 subscribers. In 2021, Ko and Miller expanded their podcast into Tiny Meat Gang Studios, a comedy podcast network. Ko stepped down from day-to-day operations in 2024 after YouTuber Tana Mongeau accused him of statutory rape.

== Early life ==
Ko was born Cody Michael Kolodziejzyk in Calgary on 22 November 1990, the son of professional cyclist Greg Kolodziejzyk and his wife Helen. He enrolled at Duke University in North Carolina after being recruited on their swimming and diving team. At Duke, he joined a fraternity and became captain of the varsity team, but later regretted some of his fraternity experiences. Ko graduated from Duke University in 2012 with a bachelor's degree in computer science. The same year, he moved to Silicon Valley.

== Career ==
=== 2012–2016: I'd Cap That, computer engineering, and Vine ===
Ko shortened his professional surname from Kolodziejzyk early in his career, as his Polish surname was too difficult to spell and pronounce. In March 2012, he began to develop the photo-sharing mobile app I'd Cap That, which automatically added meme-like captions to images. It went viral and was the App Store's Free iOS App Of The Week in May, amassing over four million users in four months. Ko wanted to join a startup and continue developing apps. I'd Cap That was acquired several months later by a startup called Iddiction, and Ko worked there on the app for two years before quitting in 2014. He moved to San Francisco to work for the company.

Ko first began uploading to Vine, a six-second video platform, in 2013. He partnered with the now-defunct multi-channel network Fullscreen, with Mahzad Babayan becoming his full-time talent manager. (Note: As of December 2022, Babayan still works with Ko. She is currently employed as a talent agent by United Talent Agency, which represents Ko and Miller.) He credited the network and his background in computer engineering for his early success. In May 2014, Ko and his friend Devon Townsend left on an eight-month backpacking trip in southeast Asia. Throughout the trip, the pair created Vines and started several side projects for ad revenue and experience creating apps with other technologies such as Node.js. The videos were unexpectedly viral and Ko became a popular figure on Vine. He had amassed over 290,000 followers by July.

In January 2015, the two returned to the United States. Moving to Los Angeles, they looked for software jobs and continued to make Vines. Ko collaborated with comedian Hannibal Buress to promote Buress' Comedy Central show Why? with Hannibal Buress (2015). By November 2015, he had almost two million followers on the platform.

Ko worked for the company Victorious for eight months and had less time to create content. He also frequently had to leave midday for auditions. His manager gave him a job as a senior iOS developer at her employer Fullscreen, where they would be more relaxed about him leaving midday for content creation as a social media company. Ko contributed to the code for Fullscreen's subscription service. At Fullscreen, Ko also met Noel Miller, a web designer from marketing and fellow Viner, by chance after they had previously talked online. The pair became close and often created internet content on their lunch breaks. He quit his job at Fullscreen in July 2016, deciding that he could support himself on sponsorships alone.

=== 2016–2019: YouTube commentary, music, and podcasts ===
[That's Cringe started when Miller] sent me this video of a blowjob robot [...] Super funny. And I was like, we could do this for a video—watch it, and rip it on for 20 minutes.

— Cody Ko, Forbes

Ko joined YouTube on 30 May 2014. After Vine was discontinued, he shifted to YouTube content. He and Miller became popular on YouTube with their series That's Cringe, hosted on Ko's channel, where the two react to content they consider dumb. That's Cringe has over 153 million combined views and makes up most of his channel's most popular videos. An episode on controversial YouTuber Jake Paul in October 2017 amassed over seventeen million views. Another episode on the Christian lifestyle channel Girl Defined spurred viral TikTok memes mocking Girl Defined and their videos' themes of extended chastity.

Ko's other content focuses on internet culture, such as criticism of internet personalities, NFTs or ASMR videos involving dangerous acts. He and other commentary YouTubers have been described as "media critics" for an online millennial audience. Vulture said that his videos helped bring attention to YouTube commentary and help it grow from a subsection of reaction videos. Ko is also part of the cast of Jimmy Tatro's web series The Real Bros of Simi Valley, which airs on Facebook Watch. He used to edit his videos himself, but began to hire outside editors and a production team.

Ko and Miller have made satirical rap songs together as Tiny Meat Gang (TMG) since 2017. Miller dubbed the pair "Tiny Meat Gang" after joking about "the weird idea of an 'unborn child as an fboy [sic]' posing in a sonogram". However, the two began considering music earnestly after they were contacted by producer Diamond Pistols and released their first extended play Bangers & Ass the same year. After struggling with repeated demonetization, Ko and Miller began the Tiny Meat Gang Podcast in October 2017 to make up for losses. Each hour-long episode discusses various topics related to pop and internet culture.

In 2018, Ko and Miller went on tour and reached 1 million subscribers on his main channel in June. In an interview with Tubefilter, Ko attributed his success to "ripping on the Paul brothers." The same year, Post Malone was featured in an episode of their podcast and Tiny Meat Gang released their second EP, Locals Only.

=== 2019–2021: Tiny Meat Gang and continued growth ===
In early 2019, Tiny Meat Gang won Best Podcast at the 11th Shorty Awards. Ko and Miller also appeared in a live comedy tour across the United States as Tiny Meat Gang. After Jake Paul released a vlog confronting Ko, who he called a 'cyberbully', in person on Jeff Wittek's podcast, Paul was widely criticized online and the video received over 800,000 dislikes. The Washington Post described it as an example of celebrities dismissing genuine criticism as hate; however, Ko gained around 140,000 subscribers directly after the incident and surpassed four million by late 2019.

Tiny Meat Gang collaborated with Blackbear for the single "Short Kings Anthem". In October, they signed with Arista Records and announced a new EP. In October 2020, Ko hosted an eight-episode podcast on iHeartRadio titled The Pleasure is Ours, with guest stars such as Drew Gooden and Emma Chamberlain, in which they discuss truisms and popular sayings.

Adlan Jackson of The New York Times Magazine noted that as Ko and Miller rose in popularity, many of the figures they have mocked appeared in their videos. After criticizing Dhar Mann for his formulaic videos, Ko produced one of his videos and shifted his opinion, saying they were made that way so that his audience, mainly foreigners and children, could understand. Controversial entrepreneur Gary Vaynerchuk also appeared in a 2021 episode of Tiny Meat Gang. Due to this, some fans began to worry about a potential conflict of interest and that the two "would [be incentivized] to pull their punches."

=== 2021–2023: Tiny Meat Gang Studios ===
In October 2021, Ko and Miller co-founded Tiny Meat Gang Studios (later renamed TMG Studios), a comedy podcast network. They are represented by United Talent Agency, who have assisted in the network's expansion. The flagship Tiny Meat Gang Podcast became divided into one free and one subscriber-only hour-long segment. It had over 200 million downloads in 2022. An October 2022 episode featuring the YouTuber MrBeast became one of the most-viewed episodes of the podcast. In 2024, TMG brought several more podcasts under their umbrella, including Emergency Intercom. He stepped down from the company's day-to-day operations in 2024.

Ko got into marathon running during the COVID-19 pandemic, when he "got into a weird rut" and signed up for his first ultramarathon. Documenting his running training on a separate channel, Cody Trains, Ko ran three more marathons and an Ironman Triathlon by late 2023. In the 2020s, Ko started making popular reaction videos to dating web shows, especially those produced by Jubilee Media and The Cut. He voiced the eponymous button on one such show, The Button. Ko has steadily released singles, such as "Not Going Home" and The Button–inspired "Nightmare" and is a resident DJ at Wynn Las Vegas.

=== 2024–present: Statutory rape allegations ===
In May 2024, YouTuber Tana Mongeau stated on her podcast Cancelled that she and Ko had had sex in Florida when she was 17 and he was 25. Florida law forbids sex where one partner is under 18 and the other over 24. While the allegation was reported on by Rolling Stone the following month, it did not receive widespread attention from other YouTubers and the larger media until YouTuber D'Angelo Wallace uploaded a video covering the subject in July. Ko did not immediately respond to the allegation, but he stepped down from day-to-day operations at TMG Studios on 26 July. Emergency Intercom's creators also left the network, bringing the studio's number of podcasts to six. According to Social Blade, his YouTube channel lost around 250,000 subscribers in the following 30 days. He subsequently took a hiatus from YouTube for several months, gradually returning from December 2024.

== Personal life ==
Ko met American teacher Kelsey Kreppel at a friend's party in June 2017, and they began dating three months later. In 2018, they moved into an apartment in Marina del Rey, California, and Kreppel started appearing in his videos. In 2020, they purchased their first home in the Venice area of Los Angeles, which they sold when they purchased a new home in Malibu, California. They became engaged on 18 December 2021, and were married on 4 February 2023 in Indian Wells, California. In 2023, they sold their Malibu home and purchased Reese Witherspoon's former holiday home in a different area of Malibu. They announced the birth of their first child, Otis, in January 2024.

== Discography and additional works ==
Singles, features, & alternate versions
Title	Type	Additional artists	Release date	Year	Ref.
"Cuddle Bug"	Single		March 20	2019	
"Fuck Halloween"	Single		October 14	2019	
"One for the Billionaires"	Single		March 1	2022	
"Fiat"	Single	Matt Miggz	September 16	2022	
"Knock it Off - Space Rangers Remix"	Single	Space Rangers	October 14	2022	
"Moderation"	Single	Space Rangers	December 9	2022	
"Til I Die - Cody Ko Remix"	Remix	Space Rangers, Disco Lines	July 14	2023	
"Bop It"	Single	Space Rangers	September 22	2023	
"Not Going Home"	Single	Sunday Scaries	November 10	2023	
"Nightmare"	Single	Young Nut	April 5	2024	
"Should I Stay or Should I Go"	Single	Moonlght	May 28	2024	

Appears on & additional works
Title	Additional contributors	Year(s)	Type of work	Ref.
Tiny Meat Gang (TMG)	Noel Miller	2017–2024	Comedy, music production	
The Tiny Meat Gang Podcast	Noel Miller	2017–2024	Podcast, comedy	

== Filmography ==
Year	Title	Role	Notes	Ref.
2016	Camp Unplug	Himself	Vine series	
2017	GOAT Rodeo with Cody Ko	Himself	Weekly Fullscreen series	
2017–2020	The Real Bros of Simi Valley	Wade Sanders	Main role	
2017	The Boonies	Teddy	Main role	
2024	The Real Bros of Simi Valley: The Movie	Wade Sanders	Main role	

== Awards and nominations ==
Year	Award	Category	Nominee(s)	Result	Ref.
2018	10th Shorty Awards	YouTuber of the Year	Cody Ko	Nominated	
2019	11th Shorty Awards	Best Podcast	The Tiny Meat Gang Podcast	Won	
2019	9th Streamy Awards	Show of the Year	The Tiny Meat Gang Podcast	Nominated	
2019	9th Streamy Awards	Podcast	The Tiny Meat Gang Podcast	Nominated	
