= ReesaTeesa =

American content creator, storyteller, and internet personality

ReesaTeesa (Born February 15, 1985), born Tareasa Michele Johnson, is an American content creator, storyteller, and internet personality. She rose to prominence in 2024 following the virality of her 50-part TikTok series, "Who TF Did I Marry?", which details her relationship and marriage to a man she described as a pathological liar. Johnson's narration drew widespread attention, accumulating millions of views and leading to media appearances, a talent agency signing, and a forthcoming television adaptation.

== Early life and education ==
Tareasa Michele Johnson was born in Willingboro, New Jersey, to Tamera Johnson. Johnson has mentioned that she doesn't have a relationship with her father and hasn't met him. When she was ten, her family relocated to Marietta, Georgia.

Johnson graduated from Marietta High School in 2003. Following graduation, she enrolled at Florida A&M University before ultimately transferring to Kennesaw State University. She graduated from KSU in 2011 with a bachelor's degree in Criminal Justice.

== "Who TF Did I Marry?" series ==
On February 14, 2024, Johnson began uploading a series of fifty TikTok videos under the moniker "Reesa Teesa", in which she recounted her marriage to Jerome “Legion” McCoy. The videos, totaling more than eight hours, detailed how McCoy allegedly fabricated many aspects of his identity, including his employment, family life, and finances. Johnson discussed initially meeting McCoy on dating apps in early 2020, their rapid courtship during the onset of the COVID-19 pandemic, and the subsequent uncovering of his deceptions.

== Public reaction ==
Media outlets described Johnson as "a folk hero for scorned women" and celebrated her vulnerability and authenticity. Critics and audiences compared the series to viral internet storytelling such as the "Zola" Twitter thread.

Johnson's ex-husband, Jerome McCoy, publicly contested her account and threatened legal action, further fueling interest in the story.

== Media appearances ==
Following the viral success of the series, Johnson was featured on national platforms including Good Morning America and The Tamron Hall Show. In December 2024, she was named one of People magazine's “Creators of the Year.”

Johnson was also named the 2024 "Betch of the Year" by Betches Media. She was also featured in a Target commercial that debuted May 2024.

== Television adaptation ==
In March 2024, Johnson signed with the Creative Artists Agency (CAA). In September 2024, it was announced that a scripted television adaptation of "Who TF Did I Marry?" was in development with actress and producer Natasha Rothwell acquiring the rights through Big Hattie Productions. Rothwell is set to star as Johnson and executive produce the series, which will be developed with ABC Signature.
