= Noel Miller (comedian) =

American YouTuber, comedian, and rapper (born 1989)

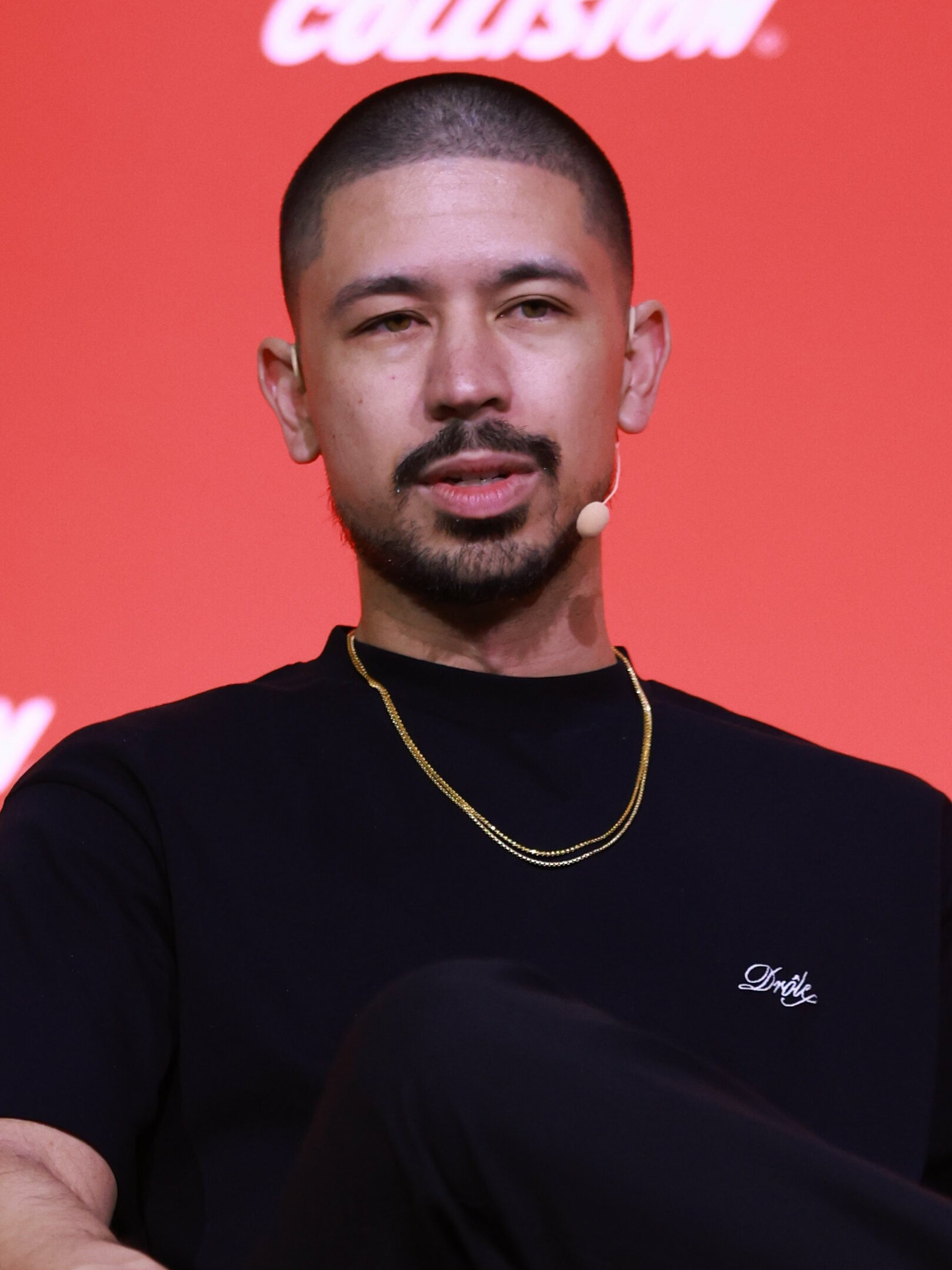
- Miller in 2023
- Born: Toronto, Ontario, Canada
- Occupations: YouTuber; comedian; rapper
- Years active: 2015–present
- Spouse: Aleena Akhtar (m. 2022)
- Children: 1

YouTube information
- Channels: Noel Miller; Noel Miller Presents
- Genres: observational comedy; satire; criticism; musical comedy; interview; sketch comedy; culture of Los Angeles
- Subscribers: 2.55 million (Noel Miller); 909 thousand (Noel Miller Presents)
- Views: 370.5 million (Noel Miller); 88 million (Noel Miller Presents)
- Last updated: January 23, 2026
- Musical career
- Genre: Hip hop
- Instrument: Vocals
- Years active: 2017–present
- Label: Arista
- Website: noelmillerlive.com

Noel Miller is an American YouTuber, comedian, rapper, podcaster, filmmaker, and owner of TMG Studios. He first gained public attention via his comedy skits on Vine. He hosted the comedy podcast TMG, which he started with former co-host Cody Ko. As of January 2026, he has 3.8 million subscribers across three YouTube channels. He began on YouTube in August 2015, uploading comedy sketches. He gained popularity by uploading a series of reaction videos with Ko named That's Cringe as well as playing the Love Island mobile game. The duo uploaded their first episode of the TMG Podcast on October 27, 2017.

== Early life ==
Miller was born in Toronto, and grew up in Los Angeles.

== Career ==
=== 2016–2017: Web development, Fullscreen, and music production ===
After dropping out of college, Miller turned to web development and began working at Fullscreen, where he met Cody Ko. The following year, the two began creating comedy sketches and uploading to YouTube.

In 2017, the two began releasing satirical rap under the Tiny Meat Gang (TMG) name and released Bangers and Ass, their first EP. After being repeatedly demonetized under violations of YouTube's community guidelines, the two began a podcast of the same name to recover from their losses.

=== 2017–2022: Tiny Meat Gang podcast and live tour, Suki, and music ===
On October 27, 2017, the duo uploaded their first episode of the Tiny Meat Gang podcast to their joint YouTube channel. The podcast, funded initially by Patreon supporters, discusses pop and Internet culture, and is satirical in nature. Each episode is approximately one hour long.

In 2018, Miller and Kolodziejzyk went on a live joint tour. The duo released their second EP, Locals Only. That same year, Post Malone was featured as a guest on an episode of the podcast.

In 2019, Tiny Meat Gang won the Best Podcast award at the 11th Shorty Awards, and shortly after, embarked on another United States live comedy tour, performing under the Tiny Meat Gang name. The duo released two more singles, "Walk Man" and "short kings anthem", the latter released with Blackbear.

That same year, Miller released Suki, a dark comedy short film, on YouTube. The film was crowdfunded on GoFundMe and received over $11,000 in donations. As of August 2023, the short film received over 1.2 million views on YouTube.

In 2020, Miller, under his mononymous stage name (stylized NOEL), released his first solo EP Push. As a duo, Tiny Meat Gang released two more singles, "Broke Bitch" and "Sofia".

In 2022, Miller released three more singles, "Rat Race", "Pacemaker", and "Day Date", and with Tiny Meat Gang, released "Daddy" featuring Quinn XCII.

=== 2022–Present: TMG Studios and the Everything is F#&ked tour ===
Miller and Kolodziejzyk founded TMG Studios, a comedy podcast network. The network, represented by United Talent Agency, hosts seven different podcasts, including the duo's original TMG Podcast, as well as Cody Ko's Insanely Chill. The TMG Podcast is hosted on Spotify, Apple Podcasts, and YouTube, as well as their own website. Each weekly show is split into two hour-long halves: the first hour being free with ad reads throughout, and the second hour being available only to paid supporters of the podcast on their website.

In 2023, Miller embarked on the worldwide solo Everything is F#&ked tour, where he performed stand-up comedy. He released his debut stand-up comedy special, Stop Crying, for free on YouTube in October of that year. In 2024, following sexual assault allegations made against Ko, Miller became the sole host of the TMG Podcast. The first episode without Ko was published on August 8.

== Discography ==
=== Solo discography ===
NOEL discography
- EPs: 1
- Singles: 8

==== EPs ====
List of extended plays, with year released
Title	Album details
Push	Released: October 30, 2020; Formats: Digital download

==== Singles ====
Title	Year	Album
"Wood Worm"	2018	—N/a
"Loophole"	2019	—N/a
"Motor Yola"	2020	—N/a
"Lennon's Ghost"	2020	Push
"Crow"	2020	Push
"Rat Race"	2022	—N/a
"Pacemaker"	2022	—N/a
"Day Date"	2022	—N/a

=== TMG discography ===
As Tiny Meat Gang (also known as TMG) with Cody Ko.

Tiny Meat Gang discography
- EPs: 2
- Singles: 9

==== Extended plays ====
Title	Year	Singles
Bangers & Ass	2017	"Super Xan"
Locals Only	2018	"Stay Safe" "No Flex"

==== Singles ====
Title	Year	Album
"Super Xan"	2017	Bangers & Ass
"Stay Safe"	2018	Locals Only
"No Flex"	2018	Locals Only
"Walk Man"	2019	—N/a
"Short Kings Anthem" (with Blackbear)	2019	—N/a
"Club Poor" (with Rynx)	2019	In Pieces
"Broke Bitch"	2020	TBA
"Sofia"	2020	TBA
"Daddy" (with Quinn XCII)	2021	TBA

== Filmography ==
Title	Year	Role
Suki	2019	Director, Editor
The Office Movers	2024	Isaac Moore
