= Emergency Intercom =

Comedy podcast

- Genre: Talk; comedy
- Country of origin: United States
- Language: English

Cast and voices
- Hosted by: Enya Umanzor; Drew Phillips

Production
- Production: Ky Newman
- Length: 60–110 minutes

Technical specifications
- Video format: YouTube
- Audio format: Spotify; Apple; MP3

Publication
- No. of episodes: 245
- Original release: July 9, 2021
- Provider: TMG Studios (May–July 2024); iHeartPodcasts (July 2025 – Present)
- Updates: Weekly; every Friday

Related
- Website: www.emergencyinter.com

Instagram information
- Page: emergencyintercom
- Years active: 2021–present
- Followers: 251 thousand

YouTube information
- Channel: Emergency Intercom
- Years active: 2021–present
- Subscribers: 451 thousand
- Views: 108 million
- Last updated: October 22, 2026

Emergency Intercom is an American comedy podcast hosted by Internet personalities and YouTubers Enya Umanzor and Drew Phillips. It was launched on July 7, 2021, on YouTube, with the first episode releasing on July 9, 2021.

Episodes release every Friday, featuring comedic topics often related to the hosts' weekly lives, as well as pop culture references. The podcast also features DJ Ky Newman, who serves as the audio engineer behind the camera. Newman often participates in the podcast conversation alongside the hosts. As of 2025, the podcast has amassed over 88 million total views, also including an array of guests and appearances, including model Alex Consani, actor Finn Wolfhard, actress and model Barbie Ferreira, social media influencer Devon Lee Carlson, and singer-songwriter Conan Gray.

In 2024, they were voted fifth greatest podcast by the users of online dating app Grindr.

== Content ==
Described as having a "stream-of-consciousness" humor, Emergency Intercom bills itself as a casual conversational and humor podcast hosted by a "best friend duo" Enya Umanzor and Drew Phillips, started during the pandemic "out of boredom." Umanzor is a Miami-born American YouTuber who originally began her online presence on short-form video platform Vine, later moving to Los Angeles, California. After her increased audience on both YouTube and Instagram, Umanzor became closely linked with fashion content creation, creating a "unique" style and collaborating on campaigns such as Miu Miu, Celine and Marc Jacobs. Phillips is an American YouTuber born in Granbury, Texas, who first gained traction on Vine, later moving to Los Angeles.

The two met through Pressplay, a management company that facilitates tours for social media creators to host meet-and-greet events. Umanzor initially launched a SoundCloud podcast titled Radio is Dead, which notably featured American influencer and YouTuber Emma Chamberlain. Umanzor and Phillips later co-founded Emergency Intercom during the pandemic after multiple delays and earlier plans to start a podcast together.

Until May 2024, the podcast was recorded at the hosts' home in Los Angeles, before moving to a studio set following their partnership with Tiny Meat Gang studios. In July, they announced their separation from Tiny Meat Gang on Instagram, later returning to the original filming location of their home.

The podcast has also held live events, mainly at university campuses across the United States.

=== Format and availability ===
An episode of Emergency Intercom is typically between 60 and 110 minutes long. Most episodes of the show are available in video format on YouTube, as well as podcast hosting services such as Spotify and Apple Podcasts. Subscribers who contribute at least $5 per month via Patreon gain access to additional content, including special premium bonus episodes. As of July 2026, the show has 19,638 Patreon subscribers.

=== Episodes ===
As of July 29, 2026, 245 public episodes of Emergency Intercom have been released. The show's most frequent guest appearance is vocalist of the band Greer and friend of the hosts Josiah Ziegler, at seven notable appearances, followed by Orion Carloto at three notable appearances on the podcast. Episodes on holiday weeks often feature a special addition, notably the hosts in-costume for each year's Halloween. Episodes in which the hosts are in long distance from each other are often recorded on Zoom; and as stated by host Enya are her "favorite", leaving "more space for absurd jokes."

2021 episodes

| No. | Title | Guest(s) | Original release date | Notes |
|---|---|---|---|---|
| 1 | "We're Back!" | — | July 9, 2021 | — |
| 2 | "Outing Drew" | — | July 16, 2021 | — |
| 3 | "Our House is Cursed" | — | July 23, 2021 | — |
| 4 | "Stinky Clowns from Space" | — | July 30, 2021 | — |
| 5 | "Dreaming About Nightmares" | — | August 6, 2021 | — |
| 6 | "Drew Stinks" | — | August 13, 2021 | — |
| 7 | "Milking Enya's Death" | — | August 20, 2021 | — |
| 8 | "We Have Fleas" | — | August 27, 2021 | Filmed in Enya's car |
| 9 | "Nightmare Blurnt Rotations" | — | September 3, 2021 | — |
| 10 | "Sexy, Not Smart" | — | September 10, 2021 | — |
| 11 | "Seasonal Depression Rules!" | — | September 17, 2021 | — |
| 12 | "Our First Fight" | — | September 24, 2021 | — |
| 13 | "Drew Passed Away" | — | October 1, 2021 | — |
| 14 | "Notes App Apologies" | — | October 8, 2021 | — |
| 15 | "The Hey Incident" | — | October 16, 2021 | — |
| 16 | "We’re Toxic and Going Away." | — | October 22, 2021 | — |
| 17 | "Halloween special" | Josiah Ziegler | October 29, 2021 | First guest appearance episode, Josiah. Halloween special episode |
| 18 | "We moved to New York City" | — | November 5, 2021 | Filmed on a rooftop in New York City |
| 19 | "Episode 19" | — | November 12, 2021 | — |
| 20 | "We ran away" | — | November 19, 2021 | Filmed in Joshua Tree, California |
| 21 | "We Are Still Lost (W/ Josiah)" | Josiah Ziegler | November 26, 2021 | Filmed in a desert in Southern California |
| 22 | "We love James Charles" | — | December 3, 2021 | — |
| 23 | "Dreams and the Astral Plane" | — | December 10, 2021 | — |
| 24 | "childstars, complaining, conspiracy theories" | — | December 17, 2021 | — |
| 25 | "Drake took me backstage" | — | December 24, 2021 | Christmas special episode |
| 26 | "sinister energies" | — | December 31, 2021 | — |

2022 episodes

| No. | Title | Guest(s) | Original release date | Notes |
|---|---|---|---|---|
| 27 | "We Got Covid" | — | January 7, 2022 | Zoom episode |
| 28 | "your problematic faves" | — | January 14, 2022 | — |
| 29 | "Enya Was Catfished" | — | January 21, 2022 | — |
| 30 | "Exposing our DMs" | — | January 28, 2022 | — |
| 31 | "Pooping In The Club" | — | February 4, 2022 | — |
| 32 | "we ran away to mexico" | — | February 11, 2022 | Filmed in Tepoztlán, Mexico |
| 33 | "Humanity Has Gone Too Far" | — | February 18, 2022 | — |
| 34 | "our polyamorous relationship w/ Ky" | Ky Newman as an on-camera guest | February 25, 2022 | — |
| 35 | "starting a cult" | — | March 4, 2022 | — |
| 36 | "our friends are parasites" | Lucas Ovalle, Finn Wolfhard, Josh Ovalle, Elsie Pearls, Orion Carloto | March 11, 2022 | Filmed in Enya's father's car, in Florida |
| 37 | "drews losing his mind" | — | March 18, 2022 | — |
| 38 | "enya breaks drew" | — | March 25, 2022 | — |
| 39 | "we met the killer" | — | April 1, 2022 | — |
| 40 | "men shouldn't have instagram they're using it to cheat on their partner" | — | April 8, 2022 | — |
| 41 | "we’re having a baby" | — | April 15, 2022 | — |
| 42 | "the world will end in three years/coachella outfits" | — | April 22, 2022 | — |
| 43 | "we have decided the fate of humanity" | — | April 29, 2022 | — |
| 44 | "our last episode" | Devon Lee Carlson | May 6, 2022 | Zoom episode |
| 45 | "reminiscing about our traumatic pasts" | — | May 13, 2022 | — |
| 46 | "the rapture happened and this episode will only get three views" | — | May 20, 2022 | — |
| 47 | "drew got veneers" | — | May 27, 2022 | — |
| 48 | "enya passed away" | — | June 3, 2022 | — |
| 49 | "Enya is still a 1D stan" | — | June 10, 2022 | — |
| 50 | "drew has a crush" | — | June 17, 2022 | — |
| 51 | "enya and orion went on a trip without drew" | — | June 25, 2022 | Zoom episode |
| 52 | "drew kissed Bella hadid" | — | July 1, 2022 | — |
| 53 | "1 year anniversary" | — | July 8, 2022 | — |
| 54 | "we're gonna collab with mr beast" | — | July 15, 2022 | — |
| 55 | "drew hates enya" | — | July 22, 2022 | — |
| 56 | "enya had a cream dream about drew" | — | July 29, 2022 | — |
| 57 | "Enya overshares" | — | August 5, 2022 | — |
| 58 | "drew got bullied" | — | August 12, 2022 | — |
| 59 | "addressing the drama" | — | August 19, 2022 | FIlmed at the Happy99 store, in New York City |
| 60 | "drew bought a birkin" | — | August 26, 2022 | Filmed in New York City |
| 61 | "drew's hat of terror" | — | September 2, 2022 | Filmed in New York City |
| 62 | "We have 3 years left" | — | September 9, 2022 | Filmed in a forest in Upstate New York |
| 63 | "the twink and the mean lady" | — | September 16, 2022 | Zoom episode |
| 64 | "Drew and Enya Want to have a baby" | — | September 23, 2022 | — |
| 65 | "Podcasters are essential workers change our minds" | — | September 30, 2022 | — |
| 66 | "drew has never felt the meaning of true affection" | — | October 7, 2022 | — |
| 67 | "Men shouldn't cry" | — | October 14, 2022 | — |
| 68 | "Halloween Spooky Ookie Special feat Josiah" | Josiah Ziegler | October 21, 2022 | Halloween special episode |
| 69 | "We're back" | — | November 11, 2022 | — |
| 70 | "drew is cheating on enya" | — | November 18, 2022 | — |
| 71 | "drew still doesnt shower" | — | November 25, 2022 | — |
| 72 | "disturbing flight stories" | — | December 2, 2022 | — |
| 73 | "Emergency Intercom is a sociological study conducted by the cia" | — | December 9, 2022 | — |
| 74 | "enyas year of rest and relaxation" | — | December 16, 2022 | — |
| 75 | "we ruin the holidays - christmas special" | — | December 23, 2022 | Christmas special episode |
| 76 | "reflecting on our years - happy new years!" | — | December 30, 2022 | — |

2023 episodes

| No. | Title | Guest(s) | Original release date | Notes |
|---|---|---|---|---|
| 77 | "Ins and outs 2023" | — | January 6, 2023 | Zoom episode |
| 78 | "enya met the most evil man in the world" | — | January 13, 2023 | — |
| 79 | "drew ate the fortnite burger" | — | January 20, 2023 | — |
| 80 | "A peek behind the veil" | — | January 27, 2023 | — |
| 81 | "women should cheat more" | — | February 3, 2023 | — |
| 82 | "We had a baby (kinda)" | — | February 10, 2023 | — |
| 83 | "drew is back to sucking on that fruity tube again" | — | February 17, 2023 | — |
| 84 | "We got lead poisoning" | — | February 24, 2023 | — |
| 85 | "Airbnb horror stories" | — | March 3, 2023 | — |
| 86 | "McDonald's in Paris is dangerous" | — | March 10, 2023 | Filmed in an apartment in Paris |
| 87 | "being depressed without sadness" | — | March 17, 2023 | Zoom episode |
| 88 | "goodbye..." | — | March 24, 2023 | Break announced |
| 89 | "Best of Emergency Intercom 1" | — | March 31, 2023 | Compilation episode |
| 90 | "we're back" | — | April 21, 2023 | — |
| 91 | "self diagnosing episode" | — | April 28, 2023 | — |
| 92 | "Reminiscing on our childhoods" | — | May 5, 2023 | — |
| 93 | "we are having an identity crisis" | — | May 12, 2023 | — |
| 94 | "Drew is 16 in dog years" | — | May 19, 2023 | — |
| 95 | "Enya is leaving the podcast" | — | May 26, 2023 | — |
| 96 | "Drew comes out as straight with Barbie Ferreira" | Barbie Ferreira | June 2, 2023 | — |
| 97 | "Have such a dope soul that people crave your vibes" | — | June 9, 2023 | — |
| 98 | "somebody broke into our house and watched drew sleep" | — | June 16, 2023 | — |
| 99 | "Midnight at McDonald's - high edition" | Josiah Ziegler | June 23, 2023 | Filmed in Enya's car |
| 100 | "Orion's episode" | Orion Carloto | June 30, 2023 | — |
| 101 | "would you trust enya as your lawyer" | Comedian and influencer Psyiconic, portraying satirical character Terri Joe. | July 7, 2023 | Zoom episode |
| 102 | "Drews hole is sentient" | — | July 14, 2023 | — |
| 103 | "Enya's psychiatrist Arc" | — | July 21, 2023 | — |
| 104 | "enya was almost kidnapped" | — | July 28, 2023 | — |
| 105 | "enya is being targeted" | — | August 4, 2023 | — |
| 106 | "we think you are toxic" | — | August 11, 2023 | — |
| 107 | "Drew is target individual" | — | August 18, 2023 | — |
| 108 | "Normalize being an awful person" | — | August 25, 2023 | — |
| 109 | "Drew's twin sister makes him cry" | Madeline Lloyd, Phillips' twin sister, and her husband Stephen Lloyd | September 1, 2023 | — |
| 110 | "We met beyonce...!!!!??" | — | September 8, 2023 | — |
| 111 | "Enya's secret project" | — | September 15, 2023 | — |
| 112 | "big oiled up twerking b00ty compilation" | — | September 22, 2023 | — |
| 113 | "Drew got a new job" | — | September 29, 2023 | Zoom episode |
| 114 | "content warning" | — | October 6, 2023 | — |
| 115 | "Mr beast is coming on the podcast" | — | October 13, 2023 | — |
| 116 | "we're losing our minds" | — | October 20, 2023 | — |
| 117 | "halloween episode w josiah" | Josiah Ziegler | October 27, 2023 | Halloween special episode |
| 118 | "Emergency Intercom Tiny Desk Concert" | — | November 3, 2023 | Filmed at the Stray Rats Office, New York City |
| 119 | "tomorrow doesnt exist" | — | November 10, 2023 | — |
| 120 | "Popup world tour extravaganza & marriage counseling" | — | November 17, 2023 | Filmed at the Emergency Intercom and Heaven pop-up exhibition, Los Angeles |
| 121 | "scared straight (Drews story)" | — | November 24, 2023 | — |
| 122 | "drew got arrested at disneyland" | — | December 1, 2023 | — |
| 123 | "Enyas stinky feet in 4k" | — | December 8, 2023 | — |
| 124 | "we are going to be in squid games" | — | December 15, 2023 | — |
| 125 | "The percs of being a wallflower (holiday special)" | — | December 22, 2023 | Filmed in American model Reign Judge's home. Christmas special episode |
| 126 | "The Gypsy Rose episode w Gypsy Rose" | Martin and Hamzah, Out of Character podcast duo | December 29, 2023 | Zoom episode |

2024 episodes

| No. | Title | Guest(s) | Original release date | Notes |
|---|---|---|---|---|
| 127 | "bottom erasure" | — | January 5, 2024 | Zoom episode |
| 128 | "scary stories 2" | — | January 12, 2024 | — |
| 129 | "drunk episode" | — | January 19, 2024 | — |
| 130 | "Manipulation tactics" | — | January 26, 2024 | — |
| 131 | "Drew got a neuralink" | — | February 2, 2024 | — |
| 132 | "we met chloe sevigny" | — | February 9, 2024 | — |
| 133 | "mother is mothering" | — | February 16, 2024 | — |
| 134 | "Drewmoji coming soon" | — | February 23, 2024 | — |
| 135 | "TikTok is a form of meditation" | — | March 1, 2024 | — |
| 136 | "The Perks of Being Drew Phillips" | — | March 8, 2024 | — |
| 137 | "Evil Vile Rumors" | — | March 15, 2024 | — |
| 138 | "Jojo Siwa is gonna be on the pod" | — | March 22, 2024 | — |
| 139 | "Enya was Hospitalized" | — | March 29, 2024 | — |
| 140 | "Drew and Enya went on a date" | — | April 5, 2024 | Zoom episode |
| 141 | "Juxtaposition of Dichotomy w/ Conan Gray" | Conan Gray | April 19, 2024 | — |
| 142 | "Drew is in the Illuminati" | — | April 26, 2024 | — |
| 143 | "Getting blocked by famous celebrities" | — | May 3, 2024 | — |
| 144 | "Gypsy Rose Met Us" | — | May 10, 2024 | — |
| 145 | "New set reveal" | — | May 17, 2024 | First studio set episode after partnership deal with TMG Studios |
| 146 | "you guys hurt drew’s feelings" | — | May 24, 2024 | — |
| 147 | "Enya got bullied" | Josiah Ziegler | May 31, 2024 | — |
| 148 | "pri demon th" | — | June 7, 2024 | — |
| 149 | "I will never start a family" | — | June 14, 2024 | — |
| 150 | "iOS is for cheaters" | — | June 21, 2024 | — |
| 151 | "Podcast, so confusing (remixes)" | — | June 28, 2024 | — |
| 152 | "Our life is a movie" | — | July 5, 2024 | Filmed at the Stray Rats Office, New York City |
| 153 | "big things anniversary" | — | July 12, 2024 | — |
| 154 | "so… we did a thing" | — | July 26, 2024 | Zoom episode. First episode after departure from the TMG Studios network, prompted by allegations involving co-founder Cody Ko |
| 155 | "Enya is drunk and bored" | — | August 9, 2024 | Zoom episode. |
| 156 | "Going back to the kitchen" | — | August 16, 2024 | — |
| 157 | "Red 40 challenge" | — | August 23, 2024 | — |
| 158 | "Honorable discharge" | — | August 30, 2024 | — |
| 159 | "Period simulator challenge" | — | September 6, 2024 | — |
| 160 | "the galaxy gas episode" | Orion Carloto | September 13, 2024 | Filmed in Chateau Marmont, Los Angeles |
| 161 | "Kink shame episode" | — | September 20, 2024 | — |
| 162 | "Addressing the wig stealing" | — | September 27, 2024 | — |
| 163 | "We met lady gaga" | — | October 4, 2024 | — |
| 164 | "lets start a podcast" | — | October 11, 2024 | — |
| 165 | "this episode sucks" | — | October 18, 2024 | — |
| 166 | "We hate diet coke" | — | October 25, 2024 | — |
| 167 | "Halloween spooktacular special" | Josiah Ziegler | November 1, 2024 | Halloween special episode |
| 168 | "make more edits of us" | — | November 8, 2024 | — |
| 169 | "we are so crazy" | — | November 15, 2024 | — |
| 170 | "Drew finally pooped" | — | November 22, 2024 | — |
| 171 | "we lost everything" | — | November 29, 2024 | — |
| 172 | "addressing drews thirst trap" | — | December 6, 2024 | — |
| 173 | "we were blessed" | — | December 13, 2024 | Filmed in a hotel room, Mexico City, Mexico. |
| 174 | "she’s not coming to my house" | — | December 20, 2024 | Christmas special episode |
| 175 | "2017 was 15 years ago" | — | December 27, 2024 | Zoom episode |

2025 episodes

| No. | Title | Guest(s) | Original release date | Notes |
|---|---|---|---|---|
| 176 | "Last episode for a while... sorry" | — | January 3, 2025 | — |
| 177 | "(Hello it’s Alex Consani (DOONGA DOONGA DOONGA)" | Alex Consani | January 12, 2025 | Released on Sunday due to the January 2025 Southern California wildfires |
| 178 | "we fired ky" | — | January 17, 2025 | — |
| 179 | "HELP ME HELP ME HELP ME" | — | January 24, 2025 | — |
| 180 | "meet our interns w/ Quen and Larri" | Quenlin Blackwell, Larray | January 31, 2025 | — |
| 181 | "alright listen up gay people" | — | February 7, 2025 | — |
| 182 | "happy valin times day" | — | February 14, 2025 | Filmed outdoors in Big Sur |
| 183 | "everything is falling apart" | — | February 21, 2025 | Break announced |
| 184 | "Best of emergency intercom episodes 1-10" | — | March 21, 2025 | Compilation episode |
| 185 | "Things are changing" | — | March 28, 2025 | — |
| 186 | "episode one hundred and eighty six" | — | April 4, 2025 | — |
| 187 | "stink portal" | — | April 11, 2025 | — |
| 188 | "our polyamorous relationship w/ Ky pt. 2" | Ky Newman as an on-camera guest | April 18, 2025 | — |
| 189 | "Country girls make do" | — | April 25, 2025 | — |
| 190 | "Enya moved to Miami" | — | May 2, 2025 | Zoom episode |
| 191 | "Arby's squirrel nuggets" | — | May 9, 2025 | — |
| 192 | "you're bi" | — | May 16, 2025 | — |
| 193 | "2015 was 6 years ago" | Madeline Lloyd | May 23, 2025 | — |
| 194 | "enya passed away" | — | May 30, 2025 | — |
| 195 | "pride episode" | — | June 6, 2025 | — |
| 196 | "gay guy hit by lightning" | — | July 9, 2025 | Set change |
| 197 | "suffering is inevitable" | — | July 16, 2025 | First episode to start on the Wednesday schedule. |
