= Nikola Kołodziejczyk =

- Born: 5 June 1986 (age 39)
- Origin: Kraków, Poland
- Occupations: Pianist; composer; orchestrator; record producer; conductor
- Instrument: piano
- Years active: 2004–present
- Labels: For-tune (2014–2015); Nowa Brama Pro Musica (2015–present)
- Website: nikolakolodziejczyk.com chordnation.pl

Nikola Kołodziejczyk (born 5 July 1986) is a Polish jazz pianist, composer, arranger and conductor.

== Biography ==
Kołodziejczyk was born on 5 July 1986 in Kraków. He graduated from and is a former faculty member of the Academy of Music in Katowice. His teachers have included Irena Rolanowska, Andrzej Jagodziński, Emilian Madey, Edward Anthony Partyka and Wojciech Niedziela.

He leads a jazz orchestra, the Nikola Kołodziejczyk Orchestra. In 2014 they recorded and released their debut album entitled Chord Nation, which led to a Fryderyk award in 2015 for 'Best Jazz Debut' and three nominations. His second album entitled Barok Progresywny was awarded the Fryderyk 2016 for 'the Album of the Year'. He is co-leader of the jazz trio Stryjo which plays live-improvised music. Kołodziejczyk together with Michał Tomaszczyk co-founded the Warsaw-based Konglomerat Big Band, whose debut album Albo Inaczej was certified gold.

== Nikola Kołodziejczyk Orchestra ==
- Benny Brown – lead trumpet
- Erwin Żebro – trumpet
- Oskar Torök – trumpet
- Štěpánka Balcarová – trumpet
- Paweł Niewiadomski – trombone
- Marcin Wołowiec – trombone
- Mateusz Łysoń – trombone
- Mateusz Mendyka – bass trombone
- Ewelina Serafin – flute
- Szymon Kamykowski – soprano saxophone
- Dawid Główczewski – alto saxophone
- Mariusz Pędziałek – English horn
- Przemysław Florczak – tenor saxophone
- Marek Pospieszalski – tenor saxophone
- Grzegorz Grzeszczyk – bass clarinet
- Ala Sierpińska – violin
- Leszek Dzierżęga – violin
- Wojciech Witek – viola
- Marta Sołek-Młynarczyk – cello
- Marta Gabriela Nagawiecka – cello
- Gabriela Rudawska – vocal
- Bartek Pieszka – vibraphone
- Jazz trio Stryjo:
  - Maciej Szczyciński – double bass
  - Michał Bryndal – drums
  - Nikola Kołodziejczyk – piano, conductor

== Discography ==
- 2014: Chord Nation (For-Tune)
- 2015: Barok Progresywny

== Awards and nominations ==
Year	Category	Nominated work	Award	Result	Source
2015	Phonographic début of the year - jazz music	Nikola Kołodziejczyk Orchestra	Fryderyk 2015	Won	
2015	Artist of the Year	Nikola Kołodziejczyk	Koryfeusz Muzyki Polskiej	Nominated	
2016	Album of the year - jazz music	Barok Progresywny	Fryderyk 2016	Won	
2016	Artist of the year	Nikola Kołodziejczyk	Fryderyk 2016	Nominated	
