= Devon Lee Carlson =

American social media influencer

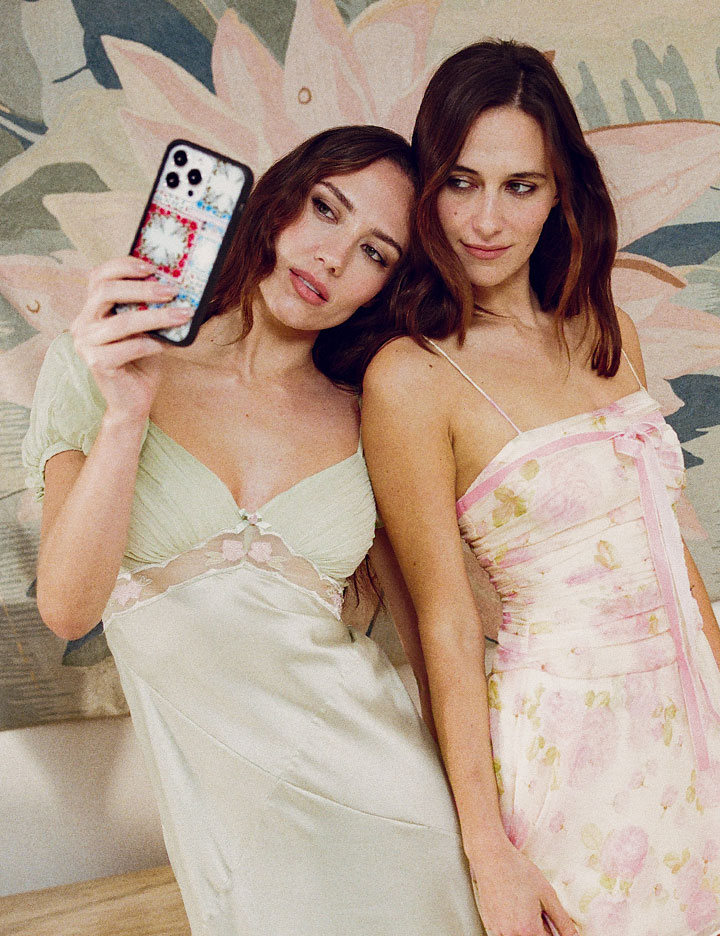
- Carlson (right) with her sister Sydney Lynn Carlson in January 2026
- Born: August 3, 1994 (age 32); Los Angeles County, California, U.S.
- Occupations: Social media influencer and co-founder of Wildflower Cases
- Years active: 2012–present
- Relatives: Sydney Lynn Carlson (sister)
- Website: wildflowercases.com

Devon Lee Carlson (born August 3, 1994) is an American fashion influencer and entrepreneur. She is the co-founder and marketing director of the phone case brand Wildflower Cases. Known for her unique style inspired by the late 1990s and early 2000s, Carlson has been described by fashion publications as a style icon of the internet era.

== Early life and career ==
Devon Lee Carlson grew up near Los Angeles, California, and enjoyed playing dress-up and taking pictures with her sister. She trained to be a competitive dancer for fourteen years, stepping back to create the phone case company, Wildflower Cases.

=== Wildflower Cases ===
In 2012, at the age of 17, Carlson and her 14-year-old sister, Sydney, met pop singer Miley Cyrus at a restaurant in Los Angeles. After Carlson approached Cyrus for a photograph, Cyrus noticed Carlson's customized, gold-studded smartphone case, which had been handmade by Devon’s mother, Michelle Carlson. Cyrus expressed interest in the design, prompting the family to gift her the cases from their own phones. Cyrus posted a photograph of the cases on Twitter, thanking Carlson. The tweet immediately went viral, generating an immediate influx of thousands of purchase inquiries from Cyrus's followers. Having no pre-existing business infrastructure, Carlson's father, Dave, developed an e-commerce platform overnight. By the following day, the family formally launched the brand Wildflower Cases and began manually fulfilling the initial surge of retail orders from their residence. To fund the company, the Carlson family sold the family home and moved into a rental house owned by Devon and Sydney's grandparents. Devon worked on the business full time after graduating high school and she jokingly calls the company “Wildflower University.”

They marketed the company with YouTube and Instagram and were noted for their success in social media marketing. The cases were popular among celebrities, including Bella Hadid, Dua Lipa, Halsey, and Lana Del Rey. Wildflower Cases did collaborations with popular YouTubers, social media influencers, and fashion brands. One of Wildflower's phone cases was featured on a runway for the first time at a Sandy Liang show in 2021.

As a social media influencer, Carlson does paid promotions. Devon and Sydney's Instagrams are associated with the Tumblr girl aesthetic.

=== Fashion design and modeling ===
Carlson has worked on campaigns with Louis Vuitton and Marc Jacobs. In May 2021, she styled Olivia Rodrigo's Good 4 U music video and in 2023, she appeared in the music video for Speed Drive.

Carlson's first time designing apparel was in 2020 and 2021, when she and Marc Jacobs designed a seven-piece collection. The clothing, including a graphic sweat suit, T-shirt, handbag, and a ruffled slip dress with charms, was released in August 2021. Carlson included the silhouette of her dog Martin in some of the designs.

== Personal life ==
Carlson likes dogs. From 2015 to 2021, she was in a relationship with Jesse Rutherford. In 2022, Carlson revealed on the Call Her Daddy podcast that she had a new partner. She later confirmed she is dating Duke Nicholson, the grandson of Jack Nicholson. As of June 17th 2026, the two are engaged, with Carlson posting selfies showing the ring on her hand to her Instagram account.
