= Greg Kolodziejzyk =

Canadian cyclist (born 1961)

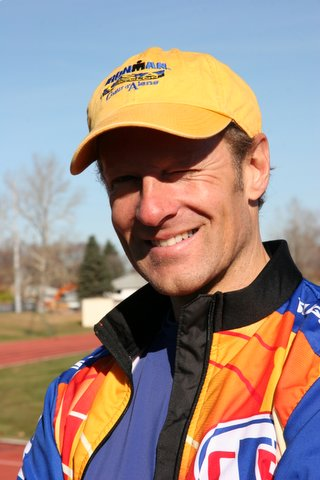
- Kolodziejzyk in 2005
- Born: 10 March 1961 (age 65); Fort St. John, British Columbia, Canada
- Occupations: Cyclist, entrepreneur, speaker
- Years active: 1985–present
- Spouse: Helen Kolodziejzyk
- Children: 2, including Cody
- Website: www.adventuresofgreg.com

Greg Kolodziejzyk (/ˌkɔːləˈdʒɛ.sɪk/ kaw-lə-JEH-sik, Polish: [kɔwɔˈd͡ʑɛjt͡ʂɨk]; born March 10, 1961) is a Canadian cyclist who has held several world records on recumbent bicycles and pedal-powered boats.

== Early life and education ==
Kolodziejzyk was born in Fort St. John, British Columbia, in 1961. He moved to Calgary, Alberta, when he was 5 years old and went to St Leo Elementary, St. James Junior High, and Bishop Carroll High School in Calgary.

== Career ==
In 1985, he formed the company Image Club Graphics, Inc, a supplier of digital art, typefaces and stock photography to the publishing industry through its Image Club catalog. Image Club developed and marketed the largest library of digitized typefaces in the world, licensing many of the fonts from the worlds great foundries. Image Club is credited as being the first company to digitize stock photography which they distributed on CD ROM disc. In the late 1980s Greg, along with Shawn Abbott from AND Group pioneered CD ROM locking technology for Image Club which was licensed to the software industry, and used on several million discs. In 1994, Image Club was acquired by Aldus Corporation, who at the time, was being acquired by Adobe Systems. After Kolodziejzyk's retirement in 1994, the Image Club division was purchased back from Adobe Systems by Image Club employee Brad Zumwalt and a group of investors. The division was renamed Eyewire, and was eventually sold to Getty Images. Another major spin-off credited to Image Club software and marketing innovations, was istockphoto.com which was started by two former Image Club employees Bruce Livingston and Kolodziejzyk's brother in-law Patrick Lor.

In 1986, Kolodziejzyk launched his second company, Sharper Cards, which made and sold printed dental marketing products. In 2003 Greg and his wife and business partner Helen (who was also acting CEO of Sharper Cards), sold the company to their largest US competitor, Smart Health, Inc., based in Phoenix.

In 2000, Kolodziejzyk changed focus to improving his health. In eight years, he completed 12 Ironman Triathlons and qualified and competed at the Ironman World Championship in Hawaii by winning 4th place in his division at Ironman Arizona in 2006. He has finished numerous marathons including the Boston Marathon, many 50 mile ultramarathons, and placed 4th over all at the 2010 San Francisco One Day ultramarathon running 101.8 miles in 24 hours. In 2012, Kolodziejzyk ran the treacherous 75 km long, West Coast Trail, solo in 26 hours.

He planned an ocean crossing by human power in 2010, but later decided not to continue the trip. In 2014, Kolodziejzyk competed in the MR340 river race by pedaling his human powered boat 340 miles down the Missouri River placing 1st in his division with a finishing time of 57 hours, 12 minutes. In 2015, Kolodziejzyk launched theAlgolab.com where he currently works as an algorithmic trading strategy developer and trader.

Kolodziejzyk has been featured on Discovery Channel Canada's show Daily Planet twice, on the cover and two-page spread in Popular Science magazine, featured in Men's Journal, Wired magazine, National Geographic, Explore, and the 2009 and 2010 editions of the Guinness World Records book.

== Records ==
As of 2008, he holds the following records under the sanction of the International Human Powered Vehicle Association and Guinness Book of World Records:

- Thursday, July 20 travelling 1,041.25 km (647.00 mi) beating Axel Fehlau's previous record of 1021.36 km from 1995 setting a new official International Human Powered Vehicle Association, and Guinness world record for the most distance traveled by human power in 24 hours on land.
- Thursday, July 20 cycling for 23 hours 2 minutes, Kolodziejzyk completed fastest mega-meter (1000 km time trial) setting an International Human Powered Vehicle Association world record
- On September 8, 2008, Kolodziejzyk pedaled a human powered boat 245.16 km (152.34 mi) in 24 hours around a rectangular course on Whitefish Lake in Montana setting a new official International Human Powered Vehicle Association, and Guinness world record for the most distance traveled by human power in 24 hours on water.

== Personal life ==
Kolodziejzyk lives in Calgary, Alberta, with his wife, Helen. He is the father of internet personality Cody Ko.
