= Bob Thunder: Internet Assassin =

- Official poster
- Directed by: Joe Nation
- Written by: Joe Nation
- Based on: YouTube Assassin by Joe Nation
- Produced by: Alki David, John Frank Rosenblum
- Starring: Joe Nation; Shane Dawson; Brittani Louise Taylor; Chester See; Olga Kay; Adande Thorne
- Cinematography: Paul Salmons
- Edited by: Joe Nation
- Production companies: FilmOn, Relativity Digital Studios, Epic Level Entertainment
- Distributed by: Relativity Digital Studios; FilmOn
- Release date: October 27, 2015
- Country: United States
- Language: English

Bob Thunder: Internet Assassin is a 2015 American action comedy film written and directed by Joe Nation, and starring Shane Dawson, Chester See, and Olga Kay. It is produced by Relativity Digital Studios, FilmOn, and Epic Level Entertainment. The film was released on October 27, 2015, through video on demand.

== Premise ==
Joe Nation wants to go viral on YouTube and reach Internet fame. But things take a turn for the worse when he mistakenly hires Bob Thunder, a cold-blooded killer, to help him.

== Cast ==
- Joe Nation as himself/Bob Thunder
- Alki David as Mr. Network
- Jack Douglass as Pippen
- Adande Thorne as himself
- Brittani Louise Taylor as herself
- Olga Kay as herself
- Chester See as himself
- Shane Dawson as himself
- Toby Turner as himself
- Janice Dickinson as herself
- Joey Graceffa as himself
- PrankvsPrank as themselves
- Lisa Schwartz as herself
- Bree Essrig as herself
- Jess Lizama as herself
- Adi Shankar as the scientist
- Tay Zonday as himself
- Meghan Camarena as herself
- Hank Chen as himself
- Iman Crosson as himself
- Irina Voronina as Bikini Girl
- Shanna Malcolm as herself
- Brennan Murray as Jehovah's Witness #2

== Release ==
The film was released on October 27, 2015, through video on demand by Relativity Digital Studios.
