= Danai Varveri =

Greek freediver and record holder

Danai Varveri (Greek: Δανάη Βαρβέρη; Δανάης Βαρβέρη) is a Greek freediver, mostly known for her world record dive in 1999 to 40 meters (132 feet) without a mask, fins or suit, in the (later established) discipline of constant weight without fins, in 71 seconds. The dive also marked the inauguration of the Big Blue Games, a free diving competition to be held annually in Spetses, Greece, with the cooperation of the Mayor of Spetses and with the participation of free diving champions from all over the world. This specific dive and some of its circumstances has been the basis of the movie The Freediver.

== Career ==
Danai Varveri a student at the University of Thessaloniki, became interested in free diving when she joined BIOS, a Greek, non-profit underwater conservation organization, which was founded in 1995, by Alkiviades David, President and CEO of CommerceKey.com Inc. and Kostas Thoctarides, a professional wreck diver, represents Greece at the Washington DC–based Center For Marine Conservation.

On October 4, 1999, the 20-year-old physical education student, succeeded in her dramatic attempt to dive 40 meters (132 feet) below the surface of the sea, and return safely. The totally unassisted, "natural dive," part of a mission to raise awareness of seabed contamination, was accomplished without the use of weights, fins or mask and was the first in its category to be sanctioned by the Greek Commission of the sports governing body. She was trained by Dr. Nikolas Trikilis MD, a specialist in underwater and hyperbaric medicine with the University of Iraklio in Crete, was formerly a member of the team of doctors working with free diving legend, Jacques Mayol. The event was planned to help raise awareness of underwater contamination as part of a larger seabed cleanup project conducted by the Greek, non-profit underwater conservation organization, BIOS. Since May 1999, Varveri had actively participated in various BIOS organized underwater cleanup projects, which often involve as many as 170 divers at one time. The dive was captured using underwater video cameras and can be viewed via streaming video by visiting Scubaman.

Six years later Danai, now married and has a two-year-old daughter, picked up diving once more. The 26-year-old physical education teacher, again achieved under the guidance of Dr. Trikilis in breaking the women's natural weight free diving record, which was also held by Varveri, during the 1st Diving Festival on the island of Kalymnos. Currently Danai resides in Veria.

== Records ==
- Natural Weight (Nature Apnea), -40m, Spetses, Greece, 1999

== Trivia ==
- The 2004 movie The Freediver, directed by Alki David, was based on Danai's story. Camilla Rutherford was cast in the role of Danai Varveri.
