= U'Ren =

U'Ren or U'ren is a surname. Notable people with the surname include:

- Andrea U'Ren (born 1968), American author
- Cecil U'ren (1903—1971), English first-class cricketer
- Sloane U'Ren, British-American art director
- William Simon U'Ren (1859–1949), American lawyer and political activist
