= Not Cool =

Not Cool may refer to:

- Not Cool, a 2013 album by Tim Easton
- Not Cool, a 2014 book by Greg Gutfeld
- Not Cool (film), a 2014 film directed by and starring Shane Dawson
