= It Gets Worse =

It Gets Worse may refer to:

- It Gets Worse (TV series), a 2026 sitcom
- It Gets Worse: A Collection of Essays, a 2016 book by Shane Dawson
  - It Gets Worse, a 2016 short film connected to the book which was nominated for a Summer in the City Award
- It Gets Worse, a collection of columns by Nicholas Lezard
- "It Gets Worse", a single by Dutch Massive featuring Vast Aire from Junk Planet
- "It Gets Worse", a rock song by Pat Chow that won a 2021 WAM Song of the Year
- "It Gets Worse", a song by Mindless Self Indulgence from How I Learned to Stop Giving a Shit and Love Mindless Self Indulgence
