= Madeleine Christie =

Scottish actress (1904–1996)

- Born: Madeleine Elsie Jane Christie; 18 January 1904; Edinburgh, Scotland
- Died: 2 February 1996 (aged 92); London, England
- Occupation: Actress
- Children: Amanda Walker

Madeleine Elsie Jane Christie (18 January 1904 – 2 February 1996) was a Scottish actress.

Madeleine Christie studied at the Central School of Speech and Drama, London.

Christie was the mother of actress Amanda Walker, and mother-in-law of Patrick Godfrey.

== Selected filmography ==
- The Old Lady Shows Her Medals (1952)
- Electric Dreams (1984)

== Selected television ==
- The Prime of Miss Jean Brodie (STV)
- Take the High Road (1980)
- The Play on One: The Dunroamin' Rising (1988)
