= Chris Moore (film producer) =

American film producer

- Born: Christopher Moore; July 4, 1956 (age 70); Easton, Maryland, U.S.
- Education: Harvard University
- Occupation: Film producer
- Spouse: Jenno Topping
- Children: Madeline Moore, Isaac Moore, Charles Moore

Chris Moore is an American film producer and director who has worked in the industry since the 1990s. Moore's first film was Glory Daze (1995), followed by successes Good Will Hunting (1997) and American Pie (1999). In addition to producing films throughout the 2000s and 2010s, he has also produced television such as the first three seasons of Project Greenlight. He has directed two films, Kill Theory and The People Speak, both released in 2009.

== Life and career ==
Moore was born in Easton, Maryland, where he grew up. He went to Harvard University where he studied American history. He worked as a production assistant at USA Network for two summers and found an opportunity to work as an intern for USA Network's comedy TV series Up All Night. When Moore graduated from Harvard, he moved to Los Angeles with friends and began working in the mailroom at an agency. He eventually got promoted to literary agent and sold several scripts; some became films: The Stoned Age, PCU, Airheads, Last Action Hero, and My Girl. When Moore's agency was acquired by ICM, he left and strove to become a film producer. With friends, he raised money to produce the film Glory Daze. He knew Matt Damon from Harvard in passing, and he approached Damon to star in the film. Damon turned down the opportunity in favor of paid work but introduced Moore to his friend Ben Affleck, who ultimately starred in Glory Daze. Afterward, Damon and Affleck wrote the screenplay for what would be Good Will Hunting, and they involved Moore as co-producer in its production.

In 1993, Moore founded his first production company, Fusion Studios, to produce films, eventually signing a deal with Miramax in 1998.

Moore became involved as producer for the 1999 film American Pie, which was a breakout hit. Moore subsequently produced its sequels. In June 2000, Moore co-founded the multimedia company LivePlanet with Damon, Affleck, and screenwriter/producer Sean Bailey. Moore became CEO of LivePlanet, and the company produced the TV series Project Greenlight as well as several films. In 2005, he left because he wanted to make a desire for film directing. Also in 2005, he was one of the co-founders of Embassy Row, he sold its stake later on. In 2011, he partnered with Bob Roback to establish a new company, The Media Farm.

In 2016, he produced Manchester by the Sea through his production company, The Media Farm, in which he was nominated for an Academy Award.

Moore is married to Jenno Topping, who is also a film producer. They have a daughter named Maddie and a son.

== Filmography ==
He was a producer in all films unless otherwise noted.

=== Film ===
Year	Film	Credit	Notes
1995	Glory Daze		
1997	Good Will Hunting	Co-producer	
1999	Best Laid Plans		
1999	American Pie		
2000	Reindeer Games		
2000	The Photographer		
2001	American Pie 2		
2001	Joy Ride		
2002	Stolen Summer		
2002	The Third Wheel		
2002	Speakeasy		
2003	American Wedding		
2003	The Battle of Shaker Heights		
2005	Waiting...	Executive producer	
2005	Feast	Executive producer	
2008	Feast II: Sloppy Seconds	Executive producer	Direct-to-video
2009	Still Waiting...	Executive producer	Direct-to-video
2009	Feast III: The Happy Finish	Executive producer	Direct-to-video
2011	The Adjustment Bureau		
2012	American Reunion		
2012	Promised Land		
2014	Not Cool	Executive producer	
2014	Hollidaysburg	Executive producer	
2016	Manchester by the Sea		
2019	Fall Back Down	Executive producer	
2020	American Pie Presents: Girls' Rules	Executive producer	Direct-to-video

As director

Year	Film
2009	Kill Theory
2009	The People Speak

As an actor

Year	Film	Role
2002	Flophouse	Jim

Miscellaneous crew

Year	Film	Role
1998	Hard	Production assistant

Thanks

Year	Film	Role
1994	The Stoned Age	Special thanks
2020	Adverse	Special thanks

=== Television ===
Year	Title	Credit	Notes
2002	Push, Nevada	Executive producer	
2005	Iconoclasts	Executive producer	Documentary
2001−05	Project Greenlight	Executive producer	
2013	Think Tank	Executive producer	
2014	The Chair	Executive producer	Documentary

As writer

Year	Title	Notes
2014	The Chair	Documentary
