= Alki David =

Cypriot-British businessman

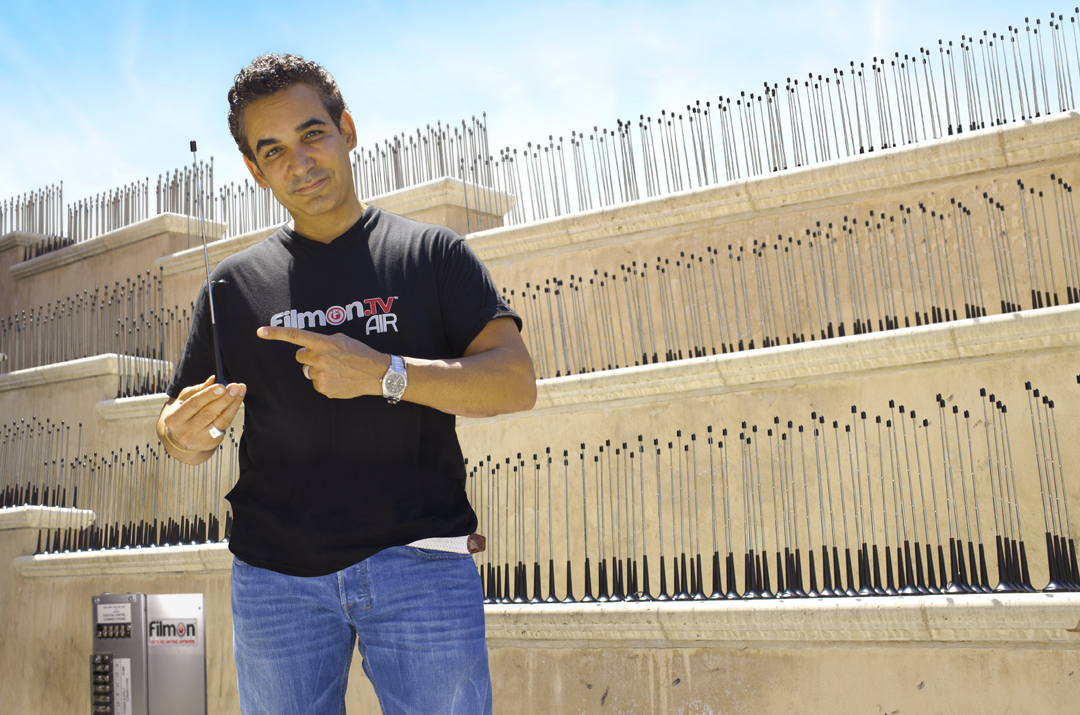
- David in 2012
- Born: Alkiviades David; May 1968 (age 58); Lagos, Lagos State, Nigeria
- Occupation: Businessman
- Spouses: Emma McAllister (m. 2007–2009); Jennifer Stano (m. 2011)
- Children: 2

Alkiviades "Alki" David (born May 1968; pronounced /ˈælki/ AL-kee) is a Cypriot-British businessman. By 2008, he was the majority shareholder of Leventis-David Group, which owns Coca-Cola Hellenic bottling plants in 28 countries. He founded the Internet-based television provider FilmOn, streaming-video site BattleCam.com, among other Internet companies. He is said to be and has claimed to be a billionaire.

Since 2019, multiple cases of sexual misconduct, including workplace sexual harassment, sexual battery, and rape, have been brought against David.

== Early life ==
Alkiviades David was born in May 1968, in Lagos, Nigeria, to a trading and shipping family of Greek-speaking-Cypriot origin. His father, Andrew A. David (1934–2000), was born in Petra, Cyprus and went on to study business at Trinity College in Dublin, Ireland. In 1957, Andrew A. David joined the family business, the Leventis-David Group in Ghana, where he managed Coca-Cola Bottling Plant in Accra.

David attended high school in Switzerland and studied film at the Royal College of Art.

== Career ==
In 1998, he co-founded the London modelling agency Independent Models, whose models included Helena Christensen.

In 2006, David partnered with veteran film producer Elliott Kastner to launch 111 Pictures Ltd., a UK-based independent production and international sales company. Also that year, David started FilmOn, an online streaming site.

He has appeared in films, including a 2008 motion picture, The Bank Job, in which David played a tunneling expert hired by Jason Statham to help with a bank heist.

In 2015, David began working with rapper Chief Keef, who signed a record contract with David and FilmOn. The rapper was let go in the same year due to disputes with Keef's management.

According to The Sunday Times Rich List in 2020 his net worth, combined with the Leventis family, was estimated at £2.35 billion. However, various news reports in 2021 quoted David as noting billionaire claims were his own fabrications, and following multi-million-dollar judgements against him claimed he was "exhausted" of any funds.

In 2024, David was ranked, together with the Leventis family, as the 60th richest person in the UK, and 2nd richest Cypriot. This is despite David's own claims that his image as a wealthy billionaire was a fabrication.

=== Businesses ===
David's businesses include:

- FilmOn, a video on-demand website and mobile service which is an extension of his 111Pix distribution venture.
- BattleCam.com, a peer-to-peer video streaming website and community whose offerings including Fight Night and other pay-per-view tournaments built around mixed martial arts, gaming and comedy. David advertised for this venture by offering cash to the first person who streaks in a legal manner in front of US President Barack Obama, and by hosting a faked assisted suicide.
- 9021go.com, a home shopping site founded in 2011
- Hologram USA Theatre on Hollywood Boulevard.
- Swiss-X, or SwissX, a cannabis manufacturing company.

== Personal life ==
David has been married and divorced three times, and has two sons, Andrew and Alexander, with his first wife. He met second wife Emma McAllister in 2004, marrying her in 2007, and separating in 2009. In 2011 he married Jennifer Stano, a swimsuit designer and former model. In 2024, Stano stated that David was her "ex", and that they had children together during their marriage.

In a 2021 interview with The Daily Beast about an $80 million judgement against him for sexual battery, David claimed to be "completely exhausted" of cash resources, and added prior claims he was a billionaire were "complete fiction" he had manufactured. Following judgements levied against him in multiple suits, David alleged the California court system was part of a corrupt conspiracy and publicly refused to comply with court ordered payments.

In 2022, after failing to appear at multiple court-ordered appearances, David's lawyer reported there were discussions underway to place him into conservatorship as his client was suffering from "downward spiraling mental health" issues.

== Legal issues ==
CBS, ABC, NBC, Fox Broadcasting and their studios won a temporary restraining order against David's FilmOn in November 2010 to prevent unlicensed use of their broadcast signals. David sued CBS, dropped the suit, and sued CBS Interactive in November 2011, alleging copyright infringement due to the CNET website having editorially covered infringing uses of peer-to-peer file-sharing software. In June 2013, David filed a countersuit against the four networks seeking a ruling that providing Internet technology for receiving over-the-air broadcast signals at no charge does not violate broadcasters' copyrights.

In 2019 the U.S. Securities and Exchange Commission filed complaints claiming David "engaged in a fraudulent scheme to induce the investing public to buy securities of Hologram and its subsidiary in unlawfully unregistered offerings, through materially false and misleading representations" in violation of the Securities Act of 1933. David was ordered to pay $100,000 in fines and was enjoined from being an officer in publicly held companies for a period of five years.

In 2019, David was arrested at the airport in St Kitts and Nevis for possession of over EC$1.3 million worth of cannabis after a search of his private jet.

=== Sexual assault lawsuits ===
In April 2019 a jury decided David should pay $11 million in damages to a woman who accused him of sexual assault, including $8 million in punitive damages and $3 million in compensatory damages. The woman accused David of firing her after she turned down his sexual advances and alleged he groped her in the workplace. Her complaint also accused him of showing lewd photos to employees and hiring a stripper in the workplace.

In October 2019, David was ordered to pay $4.35 million in punitive damages after a jury found him liable for sexual battery and sexual harassment. A former employee accused David of putting his hands on her throat, dropping his pants in front of her and attempting to simulate oral sex, and telling her he needed supplies for his "rape room".

In December 2019, a jury found David liable for battery, sexual battery, and harassment against a former female employee, and he was ordered to pay $50 million to the former employee. The employee accused David of groping her incessantly, simulating oral sex with her, among other incidents of harassment. The Los Angeles Times reported that during the trial, David "remained belligerent, defiant and disruptive ... He frequently erupted in profanity-laced outbursts while mocking his accusers and their attorneys, earning him nearly $10,000 in sanctions; he was ejected from the courtroom on several occasions."

In December 2023, David was ordered to pay $8.3 million against a former employee for sexual assault, battery, and harassment.

As of 2023, David and his businesses have lost a total of $70 million after losing multiple cases of sexual misconduct made against him.

In 2024, a woman was awarded $900 million in damages in her sexual assault case against David, in what was described as "one of the largest sexual assault verdicts in history". In an interview with The Daily Beast, David said that he was not going to pay the judgement, stating, “These people haven’t received a penny and never will. Over my dead fucking body.”

== Filmography ==
Year	Title	Character	Type
2004	The Freediver	Hector	Also director, producer and writer
2004	The Grid	Yussef Nasseriah	TV series (one episode)
2005	Opa!	Spiros Kakogiannis	
2005	Spooks	Badrak Madjid	TV series (one episode)
2006	Hotel Babylon	Mr. Pappas	TV series (one episode)
2007	Living with Lew		Co-producer
2007	Flight of Fury	Rojar	Direct-to-DVD
2007	Voyage: Killing Brigitte Nielsen	Villain	Also director, producer, writer, and editor
2007	Fishtales	Captain Mavros	Also director, producer, writer, and editor
2008	The Bank Job	Bambos	
2009	Trial & Retribution	Hikmet	TV series (one episode)
2009	Waking the Dead	Coban	TV series (two episodes)
2012	Secrets of a Trophy Wife	Himself	TLC special
2015	Bob Thunder: Internet Assassin	Mr. Network	
