= Internet Famous =

- Film poster
- Directed by: Michael Gallagher
- Written by: Michael Gallagher; Steve Greene
- Produced by: Michael Gallagher; Steve Greene
- Starring: Shane Dawson; Steve Greene; Wendy McColm; Amanda Cerny; Richard Ryan; Christian Delgrosso
- Cinematography: Greg Cotten
- Edited by: Matt Kendrick
- Music by: Raney Shockne
- Production companies: Maker Studios; Off the Dock; Cinemand; Entertainment 360
- Distributed by: Maker Studios
- Release date: June 21, 2016 (USA)
- Running time: 87 minutes

Internet Famous is a 2016 mockumentary comedy film satirizing the Internet celebrity phenomenon. It was written and directed by Michael Gallagher and Steve Greene, and features several real-life internet celebrities portraying parodies of themselves or general stereotypes. It stars a mix of Internet personalities including Shane Dawson, Steve Greene, Richard Ryan, Amanda Cerny, and Christian Delgrosso, as well as established actors John Michael Higgins, Missi Pyle, Roger Bart, and Kevin Hernandez.

It was the only feature film produced by Maker Studios, the online short-form content subsidiary of Disney.

The film premiered on iTunes on June 21, 2016, and subsequently reached No. 5 on the iTunes movie comedy chart. One month after the online release, it was made available worldwide on Netflix starting July 21.

The story follows five internet influencers who attempt to become online sensations as they prepare to attend a live show in which a worldwide audience will vote on which of them wins their own TV show.
