= Fishtales =

- Theatrical release poster
- Directed by: Alki David; Michael Greenspan (co-director)
- Written by: Alki David; Melissa Painter
- Produced by: Alki David; Billy Zane (co-producer)
- Starring: Kelly Brook; Billy Zane; Alki David; Amber Savva
- Cinematography: Aggelos Viskadourakis
- Edited by: Alki David
- Distributed by: Screen Media Films; 111 Pictures
- Release date: 24 August 2007
- Running time: 94 minutes
- Countries: United Kingdom; Greece
- Languages: English; Greek
- Budget: 10 million
- Box office: $9,216

Fishtales is a 2007 family comedy film directed by Alki David and Michael Greenspan, and starring Billy Zane and Kelly Brook about a widowed father who falls in love with a mermaid. The film was released theatrically in the UK on 24 August 2007.

At the time of filming, co-stars Billy Zane and Kelly Brook were engaged to be married, but they later split up. This was the second time the two worked together on a film, the first being when they met, on the set of Survival Island.

== Plot ==
Widowed Classics Professor Thomas Bradley (Billy Zane) is about to lose his research grant studying ancient love spells at Oxford University. He knows he is close to a major academic breakthrough and desperately needs more time to complete his research. Thomas is given one last chance to finish his work, and goes to the Greek island of Spetses, where he has been invited to stay at the home of a supportive Oxford don Professor Coulter. Thomas brings along his 12-year-old daughter, Serena (Amber Savva). The house is in tolerable condition, and Serena finds a book about merpeople that has an ancient Greek inscription on the cover.

Serena is supportive of her father and readily asks him about ancient mythology, but feels that he dedicates too much of himself to his work. The pair meet a fisherman named Captain Mavros (Alki David) and his son Dimitri (Felix Yanez); Dimitri develops a romantic crush on Serena.

Neried (Kelly Brook), a mermaid who can only take human form at night, travels on land to meet Thomas. When they initially cannot get along, Serena asks that Neried only help her father translate some old relics for his work. Neried does, and when she and Thomas speak the ancient love spell in unison, they fall deeply in love with each other. Thomas realises that the writing on the book Serena had discovered earlier is the key to understanding all of the ancient text, enabling him to continue his work.

== Cast ==
- Billy Zane as Dr. Thomas Bradley
- Kelly Brook as Neried
- Alki David as Captain Mavros
- Amber Savva as Serena Bradley
- Felix Yanez as Dimitri Mavros
- Effi Papatheodorou as Klymeni
- John Nettleton as Professor Coulter
- Terrence Hardiman as Professor Ratcher
- John Quayle as Professor Whiner

== Soundtrack ==
- Rosie Ashcroft – Hyperventilating "the sun"
- Alkie Davis – Ocean Lies
- Puscha - Steal Your Life Back

== Production ==
The film was shot on location on the Greek Island of Spetses during the summer of 2006, with extra footage filmed later in London.

Director Alki David, an avid dive enthusiast, paid particular attention to the quality of the underwater sequences. Specialist equipment was required to achieve the underwater scenes in the film.

During shooting for the film, Brook, when attempting to surface between shots, hit her head on the underside of a rock and almost drowned in her full costume.

Brook had a stunt and body double for the portions of the film that involved swimming beyond her ability, the job was given to a 29-year-old free-diver from Cornwall. The double, Hannah Stacey, used to hold the UK's free diving woman's record of 54 m (177 ft) on a single breath.

Both Brook and Stacey wore tails that were moulded individually to fit each of them and took three and a half months to build.

== Release and response ==
The film premiered at the Cannes Film Festival in 2007, where it received very poor reviews and some critics walked out before the film had finished. One critic claimed: "This is the worst movie I've seen in a very long time. I fell asleep within the first 15 minutes".

Due to the film's poor reception, it only grossed $9,216 when it was released in the United Kingdom, potentially qualifying it as a box office bomb. Other gross figures remain unknown.

It was released theatrically in August 2007 across the UK, US, and Canada.

It was released on DVD in August 2008 across the US and Canada.
