= Richard Heffer =

British actor (born 1946)

- Born: Richard Elliott Heffer; 28 July 1946 (age 80); Cambridge, England
- Education: St Peter's College, Oxford
- Occupation: Actor
- Years active: 1967–2012
- Known for: Television and film

Richard Elliott Heffer (born 28 July 1946) is a British actor, known for his roles on television in the 1970s and 1980s. His film career included appearances in Women in Love (1969), Waterloo (1970), Penny Gold (1973), The Sign of Four (1983), Countdown to War (1989), Night of the Fox (1990), Possession (2002), and Dimensions (2011).

Richard Heffer studied English at Oxford University. He played as Shakespeare's Hamlet and worked with Richard and Elizabeth Burton on stage and in film.

Heffer played supporting roles in television series early in his career, including Department S, The Pathfinders and Jason King, before gaining the role of British Army Captain Tim Downing in the BBC/Universal television series, Colditz (1972–74), in which Heffer was a regular throughout. He went on to play Det. Sgt. Alan Bruton in the final series of Dixon of Dock Green (1976) and Peter Porteous in two series of Enemy at the Door (1978–1980). He also appears in television comedy.

He went on to guest in Father Brown, Public Eye and Survivors in the 1970s. He played Peter Witney alongside Roy Marsden in Airline in 1982, and took the leading role of rabies expert Michael Hilliard in the acclaimed BBC thriller The Mad Death in 1983. He also played Dr Charles Cartwright in the early series of the sitcom, Don't Wait Up.

Heffer continued to appear regularly on TV drama series in the 1980s, starring with Marsden again in Anglia's adaptation of The Black Tower, and continued to appear in guest roles in Boon and Howards' Way. He has appeared in Wycliffe, Trial & Retribution, Heartbeat and Rosemary & Thyme. He also narrated three special feature documentaries for 2entertain's Doctor Who DVD range between 2008 and 2012.

== Filmography ==
Heffer has appeared in a number of films:

| Year | Title | Role | Notes |
|---|---|---|---|
| 1967 | Doctor Faustus | Disciple #1 | Uncredited |
| 1969 | Women in Love | Loerke's Friend | |
| 1970 | Waterloo | Mercer | |
| 1973 | Penny Gold | Claude | |
| 1983 | The Sign of Four | Thaddeus Sholto | TV movie |
| 1988 | The Zero Option | Danby | |
| 1989 | Countdown to War | Wallace | TV movie |
| 1990 | Night of the Fox | Capt. Carter | TV movie |
| 2000 | In Defence | Judge | |
| 2000 | The Thing About Vince... | Mr Rigby | |
| 2002 | Possession | Lord Lytton | |
| 2003 | Monsieur N | Monsieur Balcombe | |
| 2005 | Ian Fleming: Bondmaker | Rickatson-Hatt | TV movie |
| 2011 | Dimensions | Dr Schmidt | |

== See also ==
- Heffers bookshop, Cambridge
