= Hollidaysburg (film) =

2014 American coming-of-age comedy film by Anna Martemucci

- Theatrical release poster
- Directed by: Anna Martemucci
- Written by: Dan Schoffer; Anna Martemucci; Philip Quinaz; Victor Quinaz
- Produced by: Julie Buck; Josh Hetzler; Josh Shader
- Starring: Rachel Keller; Tobin Mitnick; Claire Chapelli; Tristan Erwin
- Cinematography: Meena Singh
- Edited by: Charlie Porter
- Music by: Jerome Smith
- Production companies: Hello Please; Shaderville; Point Park University; Steeltown Entertainment
- Distributed by: Starz Digital Media
- Release date: September 19, 2014
- Running time: 88 minutes
- Country: United States
- Language: English
- Budget: $800,000
- Box office: $3,861 (US)

Hollidaysburg is a 2014 coming-of-age comedy-drama film directed by Anna Martemucci (in her directorial debut), written by Dan Schoffer (with uncredited contributions by Martemucci and Philip and Victor Quinaz), and produced by Julie Buck, Josh Hetzler, and Josh Shader. It stars Rachel Keller, Tobin Mitnick, and Claire Chapelli. The film centers on five friends returning home for Thanksgiving break after their first semester at college. Along with Not Cool, It is one of two films that were produced for the Starz reality competition show The Chair, where each first-time director was given the same screenplay, budget, time constraints, and filming location to create their film.

== Plot ==
Upon returning for Thanksgiving break from their first semester at college, a group of high school friends reunite in their hometown, Hollidaysburg, Pennsylvania. Tori (Rachel Keller) has to deal with the awkwardness of living with her family and with the waning friendship between her and her best friend, Katie (Kate Boyer). On the first day of the holiday break, Scott (Tobin Mitnik), a former prom king, is dumped by his girlfriend, Heather (Claire Chapelli), before re-establishing a connection with his old friend, Tori, when she accidentally bumps into him with her car following a reunion party.

== Cast ==
- Rachel Keller as Tori
- Tobin Mitnick as Scott
- Claire Chapelli as Heather
- Tristan Erwin as Petroff
- Kate Boyer as Katie
- Philip Quinaz as Phil
- Daina Griffith as Angela
- Anna Martemucci as Courtney
- Brian Shoaf as Mitch
- Trisha Simmons as Tori's mother
- John Moon as Tori's father
- Yan Xi as Heather's mother
- Kenny Champion as Heather's father
- Julie Ann Dulude as Shanna
- Chris Douglass as Mike Blum
- Carl Lundstedt as Mike Cooke
- Chris Manley as Steve Harper

== Production ==
Hollidaysburg is one of two films sponsored by the Starz reality competition show The Chair, the other being YouTube personality Shane Dawson's Not Cool. Martemucci was hand-selected, alongside Dawson, by executive producer Chris Moore to take part in the series. Both contestants adapted the same coming-of-age script written by Dan Schoffer into their respective films, with Hollidaysburg receiving extensive uncredited rewrites by Martemucci, Philip Quinaz, and Victor Quinaz. Martemucci and Dawson were each given an $800,000 budget to work with and a 20-day shooting schedule in Pittsburgh, Pennsylvania, but otherwise had free rein to create their films. The contestants vied for a $250,000 prize to further their careers in filmmaking, with the winner to be determined by a multi-platform voting system.

== Release ==
Hollidaysburg was given a limited theatrical release through Starz Digital Media, and premiered on September 19, 2014.

The film was released digitally on September 23, 2014.

== Reception ==
On Rotten Tomatoes, the film has an approval rating of 75% based on 8 reviews.

Gary Goldstein of the Los Angeles Times described the film as "amusing, moving, well-played stuff." Frank Schreck of The Hollywood Reporter wrote that "despite its gimmicky provenance, Hollidaysburg proves to be a nicely low-key, unassuming coming-of-age tale," while Chris Packham of The Village Voice stated, "Martemucci intertwines these stories gracefully, and with the charm and charisma of her cast, makes clever banter and script contrivances seem completely natural and unaffected." Daniel M. Gold of The New York Times also gave a positive review, calling it "a pleasant if unremarkable coming-of-age film."

Prior to The Chair's voting period, the show's executive producer Neal Dodson wrote an op-ed for The Wrap urging viewers to vote for Hollidaysburg, which he described as "objectively, subjectively, and critically, [the] better film and deserving winner." Regardless of Hollidaysburg's significantly more positive critical reception, on the final episode of The Chair, broadcast on November 8, 2014, it was revealed that Dawson's film won the prize. The results were tabulated with SurveyMonkey, where Hollidaysburg averaged a score of 58 out of 100, in comparison to Not Cool's average of 63. About 39% of those who attempted to vote were disqualified because they failed to prove they had seen both movies by answering questions about key plot points. Chris Moore, executive producer of The Chair, noted that the difference between the two films came down to an "arthouse versus mainstream" sensibility, with the latter prevailing. Producer Zachary Quinto expressed a preference for Hollidaysburg, calling Dawson's film "ultimately a vapid waste of time" and "not my cup of tea," noting that Martemucci "made a better film, from a technical perspective."
