= Kill Theory =

- Official theatrical poster
- Directed by: Chris Moore
- Written by: Kelly C. Palmer
- Produced by: Dan Abrams; Morris Bart; Julie Dangel; Chris Bender; Amanda White; Adam Rosenfelt
- Starring: Teddy Dunn; Agnes Bruckner; Daniel Franzese
- Cinematography: David A. Armstrong
- Edited by: Maureen Meulen
- Music by: Michael Suby
- Production companies: BenderSpink; Cross River Pictures; Element Films; Last Resort Productions; Lift Films
- Distributed by: After Dark Films
- Release dates: January 8, 2009 (Russia); January 29, 2010 (United States)
- Running time: 82 minutes
- Country: United States
- Language: English

Kill Theory is a 2009 horror-thriller film directed by Chris Moore in his directorial debut and written by Kelly C. Palmer.

== Plot ==
An unnamed man is sitting in a psychiatrist's office, being released from an insane asylum. His doctor, Dr. Karl Truftin (Don McManus), recaps how the man sacrificed his three friends during a mountain climbing expedition, cutting their climbing ropes in order to save himself. Although the man insists that anyone in his situation would have made the decision to kill to survive, the doctor explains that due to good behavior and evident remorse over causing the deaths, the man is to be set free with regular psychiatric evaluation.

Meanwhile, Brent is traveling to his father's lake house with his girlfriend Amber, other couples Michael and Jennifer, Carlos and Nicole, as well as their friend Freddy. Upon arriving, they are surprised to find Brent's step-sister, Alex, has been living there. Brent and Alex argue, and the others convince Brent to let her stay. After settling in, Amber refers to an unspecified event that implies she and Michael were intimate at one point, but Michael brushes off the topic quickly. The group parties and drinks into the night until everyone goes to bed. Carlos and Nicole decide to sleep outside on the porch. Carlos, being heavily intoxicated, passes out immediately. When Nicole goes into the kitchen to get a drink, she is attacked by an unknown man.

Sometime later, Nicole's body is thrown through a window onto Freddy, who alerts the others with his screams. The group panicked before noticing the word 'TV' cut into Nicole's stomach. After turning on the TV, the group views a video of Nicole being handed a loaded gun and told to shoot Carlos in order to survive. Nicole refuses and instead turns the gun on her attacker, who overpowers her and slits her throat. The unseen man then explains to the group through a walkie-talkie that come 6 a.m., only one member of the group should be alive, or they will all die. The man also explains that Nicole was given the same option as they are, kill to survive; however, she failed. The group decides to barricade themselves in the house, realizing their phones do not work. Carlos decides to make a run for the boat to retrieve a gun from the key box. Brent follows him, and they find the boat has been sunk, but Brent manages to retrieve the gun anyway. Noticing a nearby axe, Carlos runs to get it, but is caught in a giant bear trap. Brent begins to help him; however, after hearing someone approach from the trees nearby, he leaves Carlos and returns to the house, telling the others that Carlos is dead.

As Freddy grows increasingly hysterical about their situation, a bandaged Carlos makes it to the house. Although barely conscious, Carlos tells Jennifer that Brent had left him. Jennifer manages to knock the gun out of Brent's hand and gives it to Michael, no longer trusting Brent. The group decides they have to try to leave in the van in order to get Carlos to a hospital despite Brent's protests and expectation that the van will be rigged to explode. Alex leaves the house and successfully brings the van to the front door, allowing everyone to get in. However, while driving away from the house, the road spikes blow all of the tires. The unnamed man quickly shoots rigged balloons of gasoline, which spill over the van, before telling the group that there is no escape and that they need to sacrifice one person in the next 60 seconds or they will all be burned alive. Brent pushes the wounded Carlos out of the van, where he is shot in the head.

The group panics; Brent deserts Amber by running into the forest, leaving her to return to the house with Michael, Jennifer, and Freddy. Alex attempts to escape on her motorbike, but is nearly shot when attempting to do so, instead fleeing towards the lake. While Brent runs through the forest, he is attacked by the killer, but is spared due to his promise to kill someone else. Brent then attacks Alex, drowning her in the lake. He quickly returns to the house and, by lying to him, convinces Freddy to get the gun from Michael, saying they could both escape on the boat. Freddy retrieves the gun from Michael but eventually shoots Brent after realizing he was lying about the boat and was going to shoot everyone. Freddy then forces Amber to leave the house before attempting to do the same to Michael and Jennifer. Michael tries to reason with the hysterical Freddy, but Brent soon stabs Freddy through the head with a fire poker, having survived being shot. Michael and Jennifer run into the basement but are then cornered by Brent. As Brent prepares to shoot them both, Amber returns and bludgeons him to death with a spade. Michael and Jennifer go back upstairs, leaving a shocked Amber in the basement. Eventually, she finds a gun planted by the killer in her bag and reluctantly draws it on Jennifer, who has the other gun. The two girls argue over Michael, with Amber confessing her love for him. Jennifer shoots Amber in the stomach, much to Michael's shock.

Realizing it is nearly 6 a.m. and the killer is approaching the house, Michael and Jennifer escape into the basement with an unconscious Amber. In the basement, they hide and attempt to shoot the killer when he comes downstairs, it is revealed to be Alex, having survived her attack from Brent earlier. Alex quickly dies from the gunshot wound before Jennifer turns on Michael in desperation, stabbing him in the stomach. Michael tells Jennifer he would have died for her, but before she can kill him, Amber attacks Jennifer and strangles her to death. Amber crawls next to Michael, intent on staying with him until the end. As the clock chimes six and the man approaches, Michael kills himself in order to save Amber. As the man passes by, Amber says she'll never be like him, and though he expresses skepticism, he leaves her alive and departs the house.

The killer leaves a voicemail in the psychiatrist's office, saying he's proved his theory that desperate people would resort to murder, and the camera pans along a photograph to reveal that Brent was the doctor's son. The killer laughs and says he's now found closure.

== Cast ==
- Agnes Bruckner as Jennifer
- Patrick Flueger as Michael
- Taryn Manning as Alex
- Teddy Dunn as Brent
- Ryanne Duzich as Amber
- Daniel Franzese as Freddy
- Theo Rossi as Carlos
- Steffi Wickens as Nicole
- Don McManus as Dr. Karl Truftin
- Kevin Gage as The Killer

== Production ==
The film was shot in the Cheyenne Studios (now operating as Fantastic Lane) - 27567 Fantastic Lane in Castaic, California and in New Orleans, Louisiana.

== Release ==
The film premiered on May 14, 2008 in France as part of the Cannes Film Market. It was also shown on January 23, 2010 as part of the After Dark Horrorfest IV. The DVD released on March 23, 2010.
