= Amber Savva =

British actress

- Born: Amber Zoe Savva; 1993 (age 32–33); Hendon, Greater London, England
- Education: Royal Holloway, University of London; ArtsEd
- Years active: 2005–present

Amber Zoe Savva (born 1993) is a British actress and theatre producer. She began her career as a child actress in the film Fishtales (2007).

== Early life and education ==
Savva was born in Hendon, North London. She is of Greek Cypriot descent. She graduated with a Bachelor of Arts in Classical Studies and Drama from Royal Holloway, University of London in 2014, and a Master of Arts in Acting from Arts Educational School (ArtsEd) in 2017.

== Filmography ==
- The Bill (2005, 1 episode) Sanura Azmi
- Fishtales (2007) as Serena Bradley
