= Penny Gold =

1973 British film by Jack Cardiff

- UK theatrical poster
- Directed by: Jack Cardiff
- Written by: David D. Osborn (as David Osborn); Liz Charles-Williams
- Produced by: George H. Brown
- Starring: James Booth; Francesca Annis; Nicky Henson; Joss Ackland; Richard Heffer; Sue Lloyd; Joseph O'Conor; Una Stubbs
- Cinematography: Ken Hodges
- Edited by: John Trumper
- Music by: John Scott
- Production company: Fanfare Films Ltd. (as A Fanfare Film)
- Distributed by: Scotia-Barber (UK)
- Release date: 22 June 1973
- Running time: 90 minutes
- Country: United Kingdom
- Language: English

Penny Gold is a 1973 British crime thriller film directed by Jack Cardiff and starring James Booth, Francesca Annis, Nicky Henson and Joss Ackland. It was written by David Osborne and Liz Charles-Williams.

== Premise ==
A police detective investigates the murder of a young woman, and discovers that the crime is connected to her surviving twin sister and an extremely valuable postage stamp.

== Cast ==
- James Booth as Matthews
- Francesca Annis as Delphi/Diane
- Nicky Henson as Rogers
- Joss Ackland as Jones
- Richard Heffer as Claude
- Sue Lloyd as model
- Joseph O'Conor as Blachford
- Una Stubbs as Anna
- George Murcell as Doctor Merrick
- Marianne Stone as Mrs Parsons
- Penelope Keith as Miss Hartridge
- John Savident as Sir Robert Hampton
- Clinton Greyn as Van Der Meij
- Christian Rodska as clerk
- Marc Zuber as hotel receptionist
- Anthony Naylor as rugby player
- John Rhys-Davies as rugby player
- Rodney Cardiff as doctor
- Stephanie Smith as Delphi/Diane as a child
- Peter Salmon as male model
- Michael Buchanan as male model

== Critical reception ==
The Monthly Film Bulletin wrote: "A depressingly mediocre film from Jack Cardiff, who has here succeeded in recreating the Merton Park second-feature murder mystery of a decade ago, complete with raincoated copper (and matey assistant), voice-over flashbacks, guest heavies, and a parochial Thames-side location (not too far from the studios). One half-expects Russell Napier to materialise at any moment, pick up a phone, say "Hello. Inspector . . . what", and dash off in his black Wolseley, bell clanging, to investigate a houseboat homicide. True, the avuncular Napier rarely got into colour and never got the girl in the end (whereas James Booth, with a smile and a wink, and a pat of Francesca Annis' hand, does both); but the rest is familiar enough to set Edgar Wallace's bust revolving once again. It is difficult to fathom the purpose behind a dispiriting throwback of this kind, unless it be to tap the remnants of the nostalgia market. If so, the barrel is being well and truly scraped."

The Radio Times Guide to Films gave the film 2/5 stars, writing: "Never trust a twin sister if she looks like Francesca Annis and behaves with such suspicion-inviting self consciousness, especially as her sibling's been found dead. Director Jack Cardiff, taking time off from being one of British cinema's great cameramen, just couldn't come to terms with this thriller about stamp dealing. The film lacks credibility, and the flashback structure would have looked dated even in the 1970s."

Time Out noted: "a brilliant opening sequence, otherwise this flat-footed British thriller is hampered by something like the world's worst script, including flashbacks no one would ever conceivably flash back to, and by a cumbersome storyline about big league stamp trading."

Sky Movies wrote: "The spirit of the British crime movie of the Fifties lives on in this old-fashioned thriller about the hunt for a rare stamp as the Penny Gold of the title. Jack Cardiff directs with obvious affection for a genre long past but it's hard on such distinguished players as Francesca Annis and James Booth not to have more meat on which to bite."
