= Amanda Walker =

British actress (born 1935)

- Born: Amanda Galafres Patterson Walker; 29 November 1935 (age 90)
- Occupation: Actress
- Years active: 1959–present
- Spouse: Patrick Godfrey (m. 1960; died 2026)
- Children: 2
- Mother: Madeleine Christie

Amanda Galafres Patterson Walker (born 29 November 1935) is a British actress.

== Career ==
Amanda Walker trained at the Central School of Speech and Drama in London. She is notable for roles in 28 Weeks Later, Heat and Dust, A Room with a View, Pollyanna and Churchill and the Generals.

Overall, Amanda Walker has appeared in over 100 film and television productions since 1959 and is still active as an actress as of 2024. In 1990, she appeared in the Agatha Christie's Poirot episode "The Cornish Mystery", an adaptation of Agatha Christie's short story of the same name.

In May 2024, Walker appeared as an elderly Ruby Sunday (companion to the Doctor) in the Doctor Who episode "73 Yards".

== Personal life ==
Amanda Walker is the daughter of Madeleine Christie. She was married to fellow actor Patrick Godfrey from 1960 until his death in 2026. They had two children. Their daughter Kate Godfrey is Head of Voice for the Royal Shakespeare Company.

== Filmography ==
=== Film ===
Year	Title	Role	Notes
1967	The Deadly Affair	Brunette at Pub	Uncredited
1969	Anne of the Thousand Days	Anne's Lady-in-Waiting	Uncredited
1980	Richard's Things	Sister in hospital	
1983	Heat and Dust	Lady Mackleworth	
1985	A Room with a View	The Cockney Signora	
1990	The Big Man	Beth's Mother	
1994	Nostradamus	Mme. Scalinger	
1996	The English Patient	Lady Hampton	
1998	Ever After	Old Noblewoman	
2000	Seven Days to Live	Elizabeth Farrell	
2004	Wimbledon	Country Club Tennis Lady	
2007	28 Weeks Later	Sally	
2009	The Imaginarium of Doctor Parnassus	Shopper	
2010	Bad Night for the Blues	Elizabeth	Short
2011	Captain America: The First Avenger	Antique Store Owner	
2012	Cloud Atlas	Veronica	
2013	The Best Offer	Owner	
2022	Triangle of Sadness	Clementine	
2023	Rejoyce!!	Winifred Joyce	Short

=== Television ===
Year	Title	Role	Notes
1960	ITV Play of the Week	Judy Cherry	Episode: "Flowering Cherry"
1962	Studio 4	Mary Turner	Episode: "The Grass Is Singing"
1965	Jury Room	Jessie McLachlan	"The Sandyford Mystery"
1965-66	Dr. Finlay's Casebook	Henny Geddes/Maggie Strachan	2 episodes
1966	Mystery and Imagination	The Voice	Episode: "The Open Door"
1966	The Heart of Midlothian	Jeanie Deans	TV film
1966	The Dark Number	Rachel Ferguson	"1.1"
1966	Macbeth	Lady Macduff	TV film
1967	Conflict	Queen Isabel	Episode: "Richard II"
1967	Champion House	Miss Parr	Episode: "The One That Got Away"
1969	The Expert	Mrs. Arnold	Episode: "The Sardonic Smile"
1970	Codename	Marcadio	Episode: "The Alpha Men"
1970	Play for Today	Madge	Episode: Robin Redbreast
1971	Doomwatch	Sister Trewin	Episode: "The Iron Doctor"
1972	Upstairs, Downstairs	Mrs. Pinkerton	Episode: "A Voice from the Past"
1972	The Strauss Family	Therese	3 episodes
1972–73	Adam Smith	Peggy Houston	TV series
1973	The Unpleasantness at the Bellona Club	Nurse Armstrong	Episode: "Execution Day"
1974	The ITV Play	Miss Pierce	Episode: "The Liberation of Eileen"
1975	Rooms	Helen	Episode: "Reg"
1976	Clayhanger	Miss Dayson	Episode: "Hilda"
1976	Sutherland's Law	Christine Darrach	Episode: "Shades of Black"
1976	Second City Firsts	Anne Bredin	Episode: "Summer Season"
1977	Out of Bounds	Mrs. Parkin	4 episodes
1979	The Mill on the Floss	Gritty Moss	2 episodes
1979	Churchill and the Generals	Queen Elizabeth	TV film
1982	Claire	Scotty	3 episodes
1983	Pictures	Mrs. Chase	Episode 1.4
1986	Shades of Darkness	Madame Paillot	"Agatha Christie's The Last Séance"
1986	Blood Red Roses	Ella	3 episodes
1987	Intimate Contact	Pamela	2 episodes
1987	The New Statesman	Mrs. Selway	Episode: "Three Line Whipping"
1988	The Woman He Loved	Betty Lawson-Johnson	TV film
1988	Beryl Markham: A Shadow on the Sun	Nurse Graham	TV film
1989	Shadow of the Noose	Mrs. Hutchins	Episode: "An Alien Shore"
1989	No Strings	Mrs. King	2 episodes
1989	Norbert Smith: A Life	Mrs. Wilson	TV film
1989	Wild Flowers	Panama Hat	TV film
1990	Agatha Christie's Poirot	Mrs. Pengelley	Episode: "The Cornish Mystery"
1991	4 Play	Mrs. F.	Episode: "Deptford Graffiti"
1991	The Ruth Rendell Mysteries	Debbie Davidson	Episode: "From Doon with Death"
1992	Medics	Molly Gifford	Episode 2.1
1992	Kinsey	Sheila	2 episodes
1992	Charles and Diana: Unhappily Ever After	Queen Elizabeth II	TV film
1993	All or Nothing at All	Mrs. Lederman	Episode 1.2
1994	The Bill	Rita Little	Episode: "The Sixth Age"
1994	Dandelion Dead	Bessie	Miniseries
1996	Hetty Wainthropp Investigates	Miss Apthwaite	Episode: "Safe as Houses"
1996	Bramwell	Mrs. Johnson	Episode: 2.8
1997	Hamish Macbeth	Barbara Scott	Episode: "Deferred Sentence"
1997	Heartbeat	Jean Clarke	Episode: "Substitute"
1997	A Dance to the Music of Time	Mrs. Conyers	Episode: "The Thirties"
1997–98	The New Adventures of Robin Hood	Mortiana	3 episodes
1999	City Central	Joan Harrison	Episode: "Blue Legume"
1999	The Passion	Marjorie	Miniseries
1999	Midsomer Murders	Edwina	Episode: "Dead Man's Eleven"
1999	Dalziel and Pascoe	Mavis Marsh	Episode: "Recalled to Life"
1999	The Bill	F.M.E. Sally Tulcan	Episode: "Ring-a-Ring O'Roses"
2000	Life Force	Hepzibah McKinley	Episode: "Paradise Island"
2000	Masterpiece	Mrs. Ransome	Episode: "The Railway Children"
2000	Fish	Barbara Willis	Regular role
2000	Peak Practice	Elaine Deneley	Episode: "Lonely Hearts: Part 2"
2000	Daylight Robbery	Doreen	Episode 2.3
2001	Hearts and Bones	Olive Piper	Episode 2.4
2001	Doctors	Mary Briggs	Episode: "Caring for Mary"
2001	Midsomer Murders	Gwen	Episode: "Tainted Fruit"
2002	Heartbeat	Mrs. Sinclair	Episode: "Caught in the Headlights"
2002	Foyle's War	Lady Bannerman	Episode: "The White Feather"
2003	Pollyanna	Widow Benton	TV film
2003	Strange	Mrs. Fortune	Episode: "Dubik"
2003	My Family	Patricia Hall	"Sixty Feet Under"
2004	Murphy's Law	Mary	"Convent"
2005-17	Doctors	Various	3 episodes
2006-13	Holby City	Hilda Sutton/Winifred Hinton	2 episodes
2014	The Missing	Woman	2 episodes
2017	Doctors	Gwen Bempton	Episode: "Golden Boy"
2017–2018	Sense8	Aunt Kirsty	Episode: "Isolated Above, Connected Below"/"Amor Vincit Omnia"
2018	The Cry	Mrs. Amery	2 episodes
2021	Casualty	Brenda Tome	Episode: "Is the Patient Breathing?"
2022	Tell Me Everything	Ruby	1 episode
2024	Doctor Who	Old Ruby Sunday	Episode: "73 Yards"
