= I Hate Myselfie =

2015 book by Shane Dawson

- Author: Shane Dawson
- Language: English
- Genre: Autobiography
- Published: March 10, 2015
- Publisher: Keywords Press
- Publication place: United States
- ISBN: 9781476791548

I Hate Myselfie is a memoir by American YouTuber Shane Dawson released on March 10, 2015. In it, he recounts eighteen of his most embarrassing and inspiring life stories.

I Hate Myselfie debuted with first week sales of about 13,000 copies. His book is a New York Times and Wall Street Journal bestseller according to Simon & Schuster. As of October 2015, the book had sold 85,000 copies.
