= Superluv! =

2012 single by Shane Dawson

Single by Shane Dawson
- Released: March 31, 2012
- Recorded: 2011/2012
- Genre: Pop rock; dubstep; EDM
- Length: 4:14
- Label: Collective Digital Studio
- Songwriter(s): Shane Dawson, Eric Goldman, Michael Corcoran
- Producer(s): Eric Goldman, Michael Corcoran

Shane Dawson singles chronology
"Hey, Suup!?" (2011)	"Superluv!" (2012)	"The Vacation Song" (2012)

"Superluv!" is a song by American YouTuber Shane Dawson. It was written by Dawson, Eric Goldman and Michael Corcoran, and produced by Goldman and Corcoran. Dawson announced the recording and producing of the song in vlogs posted on his YouTube channel. The song was leaked online on March 30, 2012.

== Credits and personnel ==
- Producers – Eric Goldman and Michael Corcoran
- Lyrics – Shane Dawson, Eric Goldman and Michael Corcoran
- Composer – Eric Goldman and Michael Corcoran

== Chart performance ==
Chart (2012)	Peak position
UK Indie (OCC)	16
