= Ant Neely =

- Born: Antony Neely
- Origin: England
- Genres: Electronic, orchestral, jazz and rock
- Occupations: Composer, producer, musician
- Instruments: Guitar, bass, keyboards and sampling
- Website: www.antneely.com

Ant Neely is an English composer and musician, known for an eclectic style.

== Career ==
Neely attended Glasgow University and holds a degree in Zoology. After graduating, he studied jazz guitar at the Musician's Institute in Hollywood, California, where he met subthunk co-founder Alex U'Ren.

Neely divides his time between writing music for film/television, releasing albums, both under the subthunk banner and as a solo artist, and more recently writing screenplays. His composing credits include music on shows such as Six Feet Under, Boston Legal, Samantha Who, Las Vegas, as well as three seasons of orchestral compositions for the popular Dutch show Sprookjesboom. Neely has been called "a creative and progressively thinking artist", whose eclectic style incorporates everything from electronica to "John Barry-like orchestral atmospherics". His Creative Commons released album, Not Fit For Human Consumption, contains elements of Morse Code, old educational film clips (courtesy of the Prelinger Archives) and is part of a Geotracking experiment.

Mark Mothersbaugh is a fan of Neely and subthunk's music. He is quoted as saying "The masses are asses who need subthunk glasses".

Neely co-produced, wrote the screenplay and scored the feature film Dimensions. The film was voted Best Film 2012 at the 37th Boston Science Fiction Film Festival and awarded the Gort Award. Previous Gort Award winners have included Duncan Jones' Moon. Dimensions went on to win Best Film at the London Independent Film Festival and Best Film at the Long Island International Film Expo.

== Life ==
As a child, Neely's family moved frequently. He spent time in various parts of England, Scotland and several years in Qatar. He attributes this nomadic upbringing to his diverse tastes in music. An early fascination with sound developed when his father gave him his old reel-to-reel tape machine, with which he made his first experiments in ambient noise.

Neely is married to director/production designer/art director Sloane U'Ren.
