= Shane Dawson =

American YouTuber (born 1988)

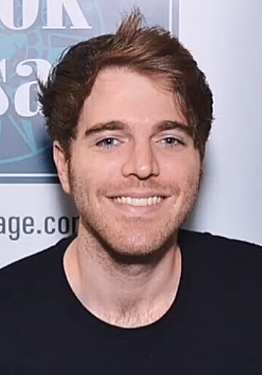
- Dawson in July 2016
- Born: Shane Lee Yaw; July 19, 1988 (age 38); Long Beach, California, U.S.
- Education: Lakewood High School
- Occupations: YouTuber; actor; filmmaker; writer; musician
- Spouse: Ryland Adams (m. 2023)
- Children: 2

YouTube information
- Channels: shane; ShaneDawsonTV; shane2
- Years active: 2008–present
- Genres: Docuseries; vlog; sketch comedy; music; beauty; conspiracy theories
- Subscribers: 18.5 million (main channel); 28.88 million (combined) (Note: Subscribers, broken down by channel: 18.5 million (shane) 7.62 million (ShaneDawsonTV) 2.76 million (Shane2))
- Views: 4.43 billion (main channel); 4.88 billion (combined) (Note: Views, broken down by channels: 4.43 billion (shane) 286 million (ShaneDawsonTV) 234 million (Shane2))
- Last updated: March 28, 2026

Shane Lee Yaw (born July 19, 1988), known online as Shane Dawson, is an American YouTuber, actor, filmmaker, comedian, writer, and musician. Dawson was one of the first people to rise to fame on YouTube after he began making videos in 2008 at the age of 19 and garnered over 500 million views during the next two years.

Most of Dawson's early work consisted of comedy sketches in which he would play original characters, impersonate celebrities, and make light of popular culture. Some of these impressions later drew criticism for their offensive content, including racial stereotypes. He has released six original songs such as "Superluv!" and numerous parodies of popular music videos. In 2013, he started the podcast Shane and Friends, which ran for 140 episodes over four years. In 2014, he directed, produced, edited, and starred in the romantic comedy film Not Cool and appeared on the accompanying docu-series The Chair. He has also appeared in the horror film Smiley (2012) and the comedy film Internet Famous (2016).

In 2015, Dawson began discussing conspiracy theories on his YouTube channel, which led to his 2019 web series Conspiracy Series with Shane Dawson. In 2017, he released his first docu-series on YouTube, in which he reconciled with his absent father. From 2019 to 2020, he created and appeared in the docu-series The Beautiful World of Jeffree Star, which garnered over 130 million views. His most viewed docu-series are about Jeffree Star, Jake Paul, and Tana Mongeau.

Dawson has released two New York Times best-selling books, I Hate Myselfie (2015) and It Gets Worse (2016), and his three YouTube channels have collectively accumulated over 4.5 billion views. Since 2017, he has updated only his main channel, which has over 18 million subscribers and over 4 billion views. In June 2020, YouTube indefinitely suspended monetization on all three of his channels and his books were pulled from shelves following public backlash over numerous controversial comments he had made in the past, particularly regarding underage girls and zoophilia. He took a hiatus and returned to YouTube on October 7, 2021.

== Early life ==
Shane Lee Yaw was born in Long Beach, California, on July 19, 1988. He has two older brothers named Jacob (b. 1980) and Jerid (b. 1985), and the three grew up in a low-income household headed by their single mother, Teresa. He was educated in nearby Lakewood, and graduated from Lakewood High School in 2006. He was bullied for his weight in school; he later lost 150 pounds (68 kg) in adulthood. He first became interested in making videos when he would hand in videos for school projects with his friends.

== Career ==
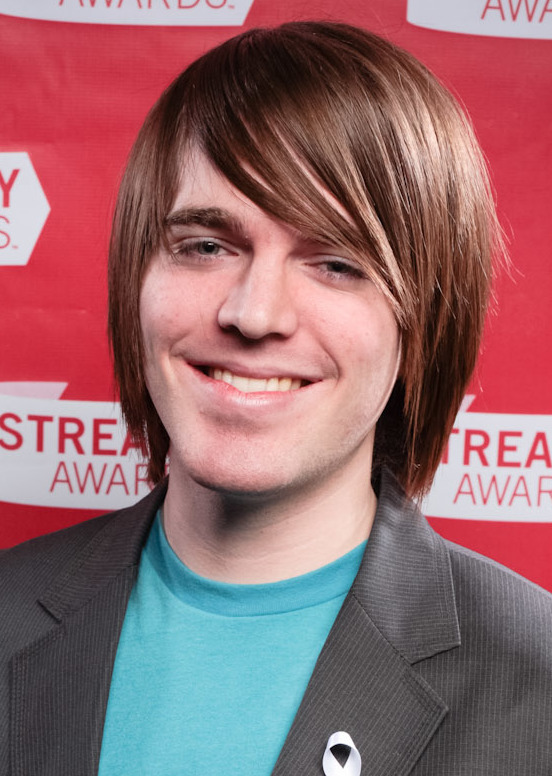
Dawson at the 2nd Annual Streamy Awards in 2010

=== 2008–2010: YouTube, ShaneDawsonTV ===
On March 10, 2008, Dawson made his YouTube channel, called "ShaneDawsonTV". The earliest video that remains on the channel, "Kermit the Frog and Me", was uploaded about 4 months later. When he first began making videos, he worked at Jenny Craig along with his mother and brother. He was fired in August 2008 after he uploaded a video of himself pole dancing in the building he worked at and for showing before-and-after photos of clients, saying that "all these people gain their weight back." The video also included clips of his co-workers reading inappropriate passages of a book by Jenny Craig spokesperson Valerie Bertinelli. His mother, brother and about six other coworkers who appeared in the video also were fired after the company saw the video. In September, he uploaded a video called "Fred is Dead!", which has since received over 25 million views. During this time, Shane performed as a number of "drug-addled, often drunk, cultural stereotype characters" in his skits, including: "ghetto girl" Shanaynay, "Ned the Nerd", gangster "S-Deezy", "Barb the Lesbian", a football jock/bully (who is a closeted homosexual), the jock's insecure girlfriend (who thinks she is overweight), a "fashionably bulimic" high school girl (whose finger is her "best friend" to aid in self-induced vomiting), "Aunt Hilda" (portrayed with a thick "New York-Jewish" accent), gothic girls, "trans" characters, and "Guadalupe"/"Fruit Lupe" (a Mexican with stereotyped chola accent).

Dawson would also, in skits where he was playing himself, portray either fictional or exaggerated versions of his own "relatives" and family members. One video sees Dawson pretending to be a high school student and the struggles of feigning "illness" to avoid attending school for a day. The same video sees him wearing a bright-red wig, red lipstick and matching red bathrobe to portray his "mother", an alcoholic, "Southern", lazy and semi-abusive character. When she forces Dawson to attend school, she sends him out the door by saying "Later, faggot!" Despite Dawson's own bisexuality and same-sex marriage, these instances of gay slurs drew some criticism at the time; his actual mother (who later appears in several videos) bears no comparison to this character. He also drew some criticism for portraying a pre-op transgender female character, who appeared in a skit about speed dating; the bulk of the character's appearances consisted of such lines as "I'm sick of this penis! Chop it off!" and explaining "and that's how they're going to turn my penis into a clitoris." At that point, Dawson (portraying himself) is seen turning to the side and vomiting, profusely.

Dawson occasionally posts new videos on his channel "ShaneDawsonTV" (mainly short web films, music video parodies, film trailer parodies, and original music) and formerly posted other videos on his second channel "ShaneDawsonTV2", now called "Human Emoji"; however, the use of this channel has mostly been discontinued as of 2012. His third and main YouTube channel, Shane, is where he previously posted vlogs, and now posts original content Mondays through Fridays. He began using this channel in May 2010. In November 2009, Dawson was featured on Attack of the Show!. In 2010, Forbes magazine named him their 25th most famous web celebrity.

=== 2010–2013: Television pilots and music career ===
On August 11, 2010, Dawson announced that he was making a 30-minute pilot called SD High. Previously, the funding he needed for the pilot was provided by digital media group Take180 after he helped them out with acting in their own videos. The pilot is based on two videos which Dawson uploaded to his main channel in Summer 2010. The story centered around a teenage boy in school and his interactions with the other characters. The pilot's release date was set towards the end of September 2010 on his main YouTube Channel, however Dawson later announced that he had been contacted by a television studio to produce the pilot for their TV channel(s).

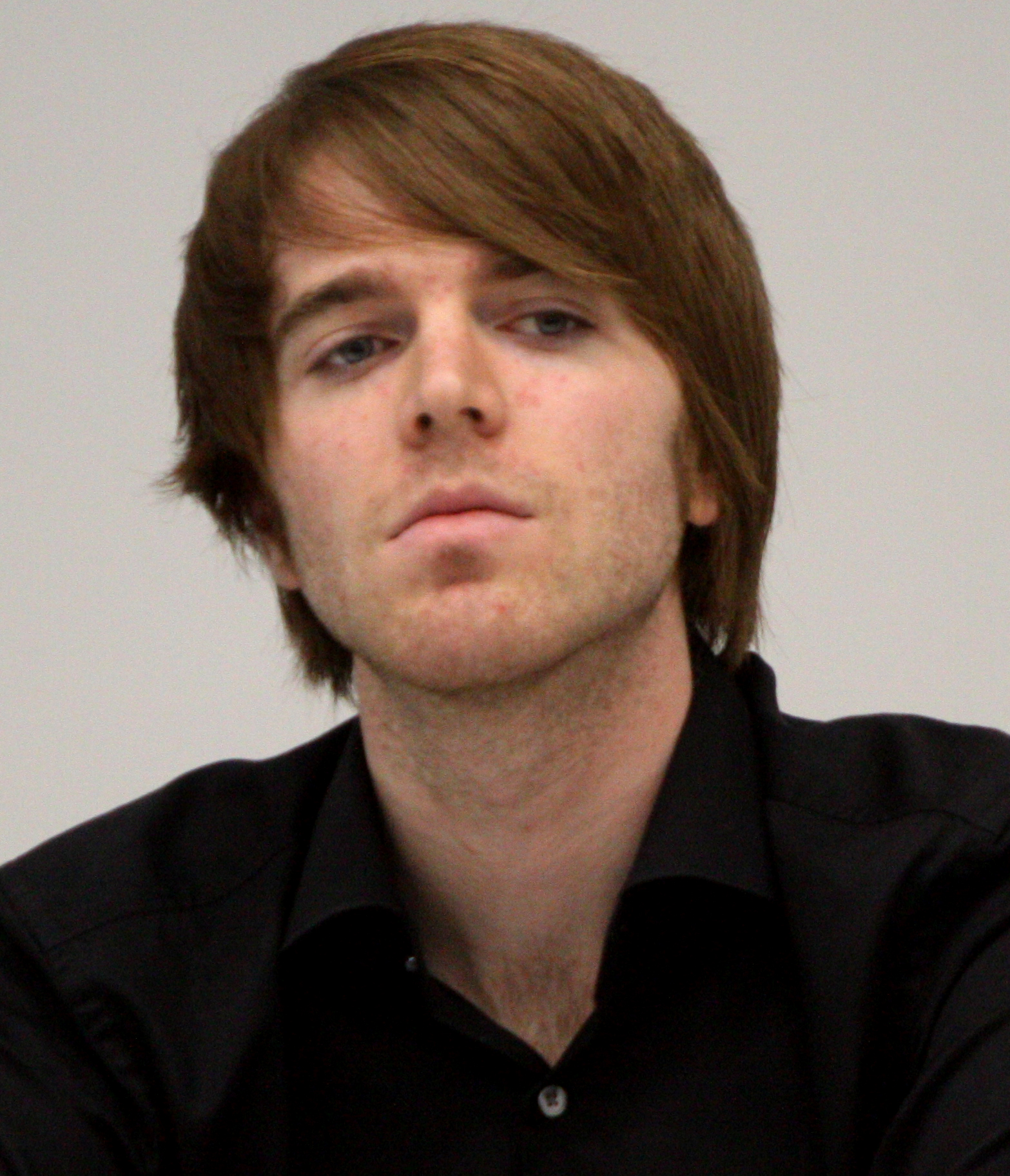
Dawson at VidCon 2012

According to Dawson, there is some uncertainty involving the pilot, however it may be a TV show in the future. On March 26, 2011, Dawson uploaded a video to YouTube explaining to his audience that he was working with Happy Madison Productions, Sony Pictures, and some other YouTubers including TheFineBros and BrittaniLouiseTaylor to create the television show. In January 2012, Dawson stated in a video that he was now working on a new television show, which would be semi-based on his life working at a Weight Loss center. He stated that he would be pitching the show soon, and that he was "really excited" for it, and stated the show was "kind of like Arrested Development, but – not." On May 16, 2012, Dawson revealed in a vlog that he was working on a comedy-horror film, explaining that he wanted to write "something like a teen comedy", however that the film would be "scary and fun". Dawson revealed in November 2012 that he was in negotiations to direct a feature-length film. In 2012, Dawson revealed in a vlog that he was working on a music project. In March 2012, Dawson revealed that his debut mainstream single, "Superluv!" would be released that month. The song was released on March 31, 2012, on iTunes, with an accompanying music video debuting on his YouTube channel on the same day. The song managed to chart at 87 in Ireland, 16 on the UK Indie Chart, 163 on the UK Singles Chart and reached the 28th spot on the US iTunes Pop Chart.

On May 8, 2012, Dawson revealed in a video that he began working on his next original song "The Vacation Song". He previewed about 10 seconds of the "rough edit" of the song, and stated that he was going to change the mood of the song, saying, "Right now, it's a little too happy, because it's a breakup song. I want it to be more like Kelly Clarkson's 'Since U Been Gone'." He stated that the song would "hopefully" be released by the beginning of June 2012. The song was released on June 23, 2012, with the music video being released a week later. Dawson starred in horror film Smiley, which was released to theaters in October 2012. In December, Dawson released a new single entitled "Maybe This Christmas". On February 5, 2013, Dawson recorded a single titled "F**K Up". The song was released on YouTube and iTunes on March 30, 2013. On October 18, 2013, Dawson released a song entitled "Wanna Make Love To You", with Liam Horne. Dawson does not actually provide vocals to the song, but iTunes credits him as one of the artists.

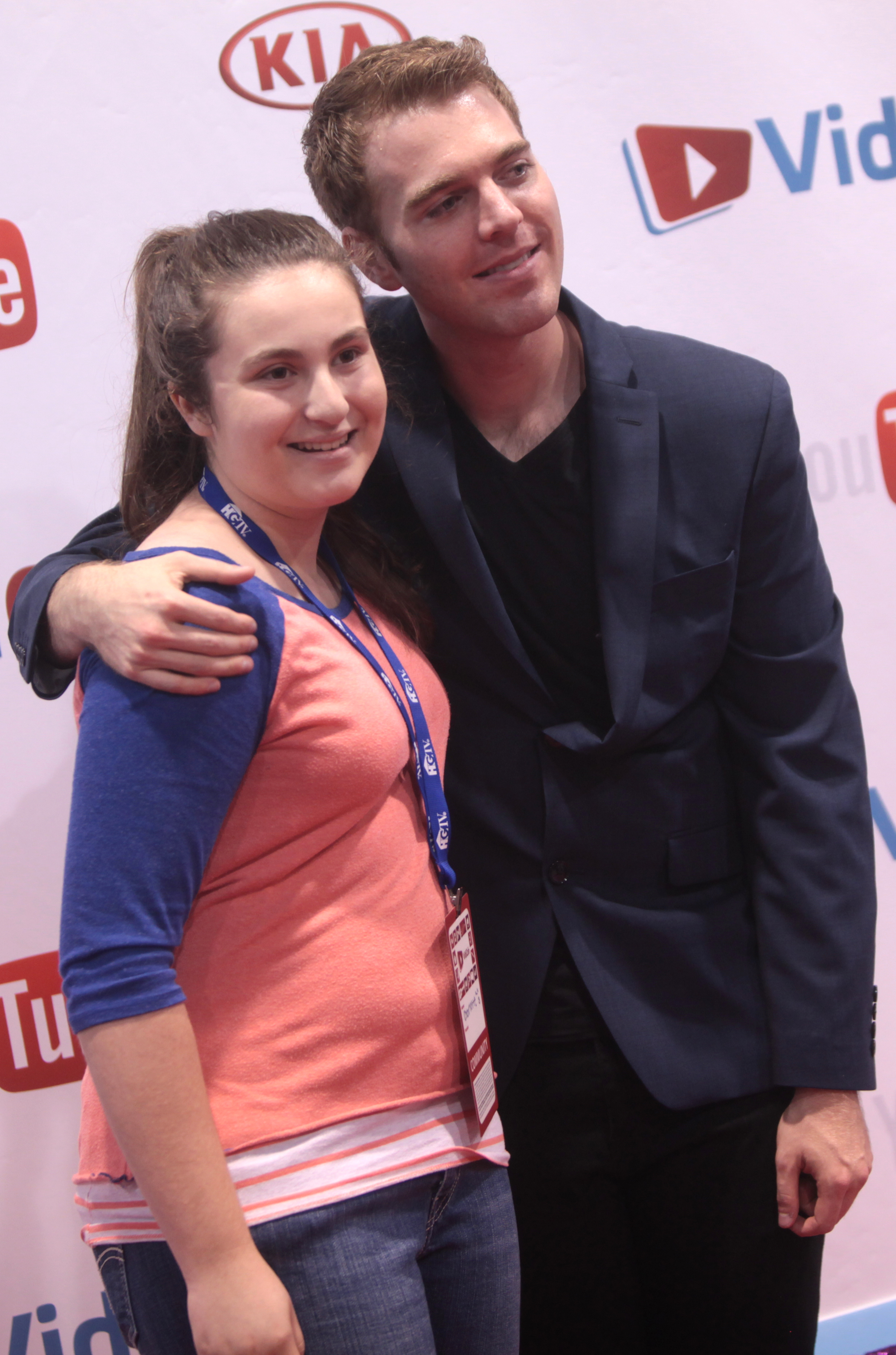
Dawson with a fan at VidCon 2014

=== 2013–2016: Shane and Friends, The Chair, and books ===
In June 2013, Dawson started a podcast entitled Shane and Friends. As of 2013, Dawson revealed that he was pitching a talk show and was continuing to pitch the series about him working at a weight loss center. On November 12, 2013, Dawson announced that he was developing the weight loss center project with Sony Pictures Television for NBC. The project was titled Losin' It and, if picked up, would be a half-hour single-camera comedy series focusing on a successful former-client at a weight loss center who decides to share his inspiration by becoming a consultant at the center, and subsequently becomes the manager by the end of his first day. Darlene Hunt, Will Gluck, Richie Schwartz, Lauren Schnipper, and Dawson would serve as executive producers for the project.

On April 4, 2014, Dawson announced that he had directed and starred in a comedy film in Pittsburgh earlier that year. The film, which was made on a $800,000 budget, was released September 19, 2014. On June 26, he announced that the film would be titled Not Cool. It was part of a Starz original series called The Chair, in which two novice directors are given the same script and must each make their own film from it. People who watched both films then voted online to vote for the films. Not Cool competed against Anna Martemucci's Holidaysburg. Zachary Quinto, producer of The Chair, called Dawson's film "deeply offensive" and "tasteless", and that Dawson should not be making films at all, removing his name from the film in disgust. Dawson defended his film by saying that "I like the movie. The producers that I trust like the movie. The test audience liked the movie. I know I deserve to make a movie because I've been working my f***ing ass off these last eight years on YouTube." Dawson won the competition, winning the $250,000 prize to work on another film project.

In December 2014, Dawson released a parody of Taylor Swift's song "Blank Space" on YouTube. This video was found to be in poor taste by her labels, Big Machine Records and Sony, who removed it, citing "copyright infringement". Dawson subsequently claimed that the parody was removed because Sony objected to the video's violent content. The video was restored in February 2015.

In early 2015, Dawson released a memoir titled I Hate Myselfie: A Collection of Essays. The memoir was released by Atria Books/Keywords Press, an imprint of Simon & Schuster.

In July 2016, Dawson released another memoir entitled It Gets Worse: A Collection of Essays. It was released by Atria/Keywords Press.

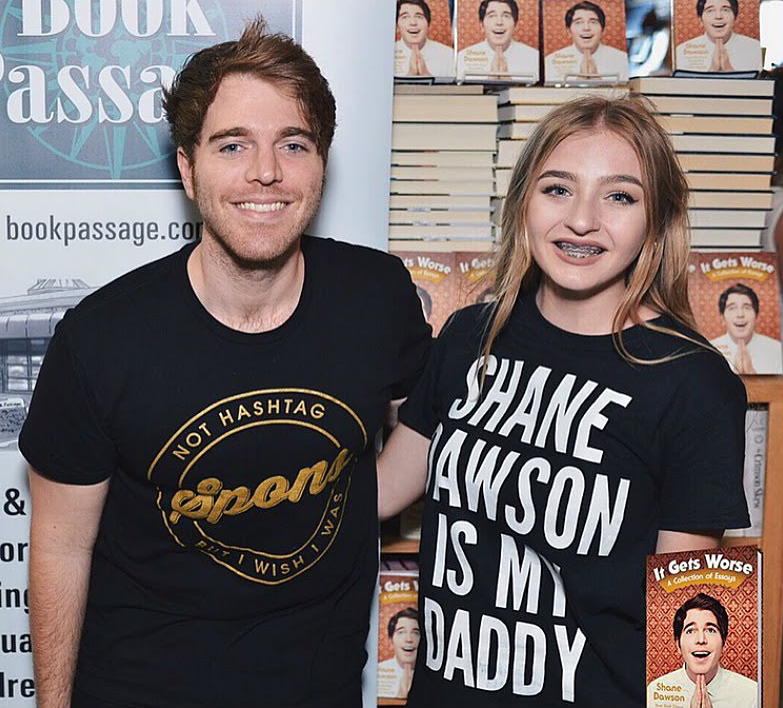
Dawson with a fan in 2016

=== 2017–2020: YouTube series ===
In June 2018, Shane uploaded a three-part documentary series titled The Truth About TanaCon, about the TanaCon convention, the company who organized the event—Good Times, ran by talent manager Michael Weist—and the effects the disastrous event had on fans. The series received tens of millions of views in one week and garnered significant media attention. In August 2018, Shane continued the documentary format and covered makeup artist Jeffree Star in a five-part series titled The Secret World of Jeffree Star and also received high amounts of media attention In September 2018, Shane covered YouTuber Jake Paul in an eight-part series titled The Mind of Jake Paul. The series follows Dawson's investigation on the lifestyle of Paul, including research with licensed therapist Katie Morton on antisocial personality disorder. Dawson was criticized for his documentaries The Mind of Jake Paul and The Secret World of Jeffree Star, with some arguing that Dawson was too sympathetic towards the racism scandals of both subjects.

In January and February 2019, Shane released a two-part series on conspiracy theories titled Conspiracy Series with Shane Dawson. The first part included theories on the Apple FaceTime glitch, deepfakes, subliminal messages in cartoons, Hollister, Walt Disney, the Woolsey Fire and Camp Fire. The second part featured Dawson investigating further topics, exploring the wider message "don't believe everything you see", including Adobe Voco voice manipulation, and Chuck E. Cheese pizzas. Dawson has been criticized for his conspiracy theory content, as some feel that his videos about the flat Earth, Moon landing hoax, and 9/11 hoax conspiracy theories, among others, contribute to YouTube's widespread issues with misinformation. In July 2019, Dawson returned to YouTube for a one-hour long documentary video titled The Return of Eugenia Cooney about Internet personality Eugenia Cooney. Earlier in the year, Cooney announced that she would be taking a break from social media to focus on her health.

In October 2019, Dawson released The Beautiful World of Jeffree Star, which follows Dawson and Star as they plan and design a new makeup and merchandise collection called The Conspiracy Collection.

== Personal life ==
Dawson began dating YouTuber Lisa Schwartz in December 2011. He came out as bisexual in July 2015 and confirmed that he had separated from Schwartz. He began dating YouTuber Ryland Adams in 2016, and they became engaged on March 19, 2019. Having previously lived in Calabasas, California, he moved in August 2021 to Colorado, where he and Adams purchased a farm for $2.2 million.

On January 3, 2023, Dawson and Adams married in Colorado. In July of the same year, they announced via Adams's vlog channel that they were expecting twin babies via surrogacy. On December 10, 2023, Dawson announced the birth of their twin sons.

Dawson has discussed his experiences with body dysmorphic disorder.

== Controversies ==
Dawson has been criticized for his racial comedy, particularly his use of blackface in several skits impersonating Wendy Williams and Chris Brown, his use of the words "nigga" and "nigger" in multiple videos, and his jokes about "ghetto pranks" at the 2012 VidCon. These past performances, and their reliance on caricatures of people of color and other minorities, led to allegations of racism. In September 2014, YouTuber Franchesca Ramsey and other bloggers criticized Dawson for his past actions. He later apologized for the jokes in a video, stating that he viewed the controversy as a "learning experience".

In 2018, Dawson was the subject of a controversy regarding comments he had made about pedophilia on a 2013 episode of his podcast Shane and Friends, after which he published an apology video likening his comedic style at the time to that of shock jocks. The same comments were also the subject of a controversy in March 2019, coupled with more controversy regarding comments he had made on a 2015 episode of the same podcast about engaging in sexual activity with his cat.

On June 26, 2020, Dawson responded to criticism of his racial comedy by posting a 20-minute video in which he addressed renewed criticism for his use of blackface, the words "nigga" and "nigger", and other offensive comments he made since launching his YouTube channel. Although he had apologized publicly before, Dawson claimed he had only recently realized how "those apologies suck" and that he did not "know who that person is anymore". He further remarked how he "should have been punished for things" and how "finally just [owning] up to all of this and [being] accountable is worth losing everything" to him. Dawson also apologized to James Charles, whom he had described as "egocentric" and "power hungry" just a week before. He concluded his apology video by vowing to better his "actions", but said he understands if people do not want to accept his apology or no longer support him. He also claimed that he dealt with the pain from his childhood by making inappropriate jokes: "It is something I did for shock value or because I thought it was funny. It's all gross and I promise that that is not real; that is not me." Hours after his apology was posted, musician Jaden Smith accused Dawson of sexualizing his sister Willow Smith, expressing how he was "disgusted" after an old video resurfaced of Dawson pretending to masturbate while looking at a poster of Willow, who was 11 years old at the time. Jaden and Willow's mother Jada Pinkett Smith also told Dawson that she was "done with the excuses".

On June 29, 2020, Target announced that it was "in the process of removing" Dawson's two published books I Hate Myselfie and It Gets Worse from its shelves. On June 30, YouTube indefinitely suspended monetization on all three of Dawson's channels.

== Filmography ==
=== Film ===
Year	Title	Role	Notes
2011	Friends Forever	Amy	Short film, also writer, director, and editor
2011	How Shananay Stole Christmas	Shananay	Short film, also writer, director, and editor
2012	Smiley	Binder	
2014	Not Cool	Scott	Also director, producer, and editor
2015	I Hate Myselfie	Himself	Short film, also writer
2015	Viral Video 2	Himself	Short film; cameo appearance
2015	I Hate Myselfie 2	Himself	Short film, also writer, director, and executive producer
2016	Internet Famous	Tomas "The Parody Boss"	
2016	It Gets Worse	Himself	Also director
2016	The Lottery	Narrator / Himself	Short film, also director and editor

=== Television ===
Year	Title	Role	Notes
2012	The High Fructose Adventures of Annoying Orange	Christmas Past / Popcorn	2 episodes
2014	The Chair	Himself	10 episodes

=== Web ===
Year	Title	Role	Notes
2009–2010	Hot Teens Gone Wild on Degrassi!		2 episodes
2010	SD High: School Dance Disaster		3 episodes
2010	Haunted House Party		
2010	Shane Dawson's Love Story		
2010	BlackBoxTV Presents	Himself	Episode: Let Her Die!
2011	Corey & Lucas for the Win!	Himself	2 episodes
2011	Friends 4Ever		Short film
2011	How Shananay Stole Christmas		Short film
2012	Shane & Friends Halloween Special		
2012–2016	YouTubers React	Himself	39 episodes
2013	Emo Love Story		
2015	Smosh Babies	New Teacher Shane (voice)	2 episodes
2016	Escape the Night	The Renegade	10 episodes
2018	The Truth About Tanacon	Himself	3 episodes
2018	The Secret World of Jeffree Star	Himself	5 episodes
2018	The Mind of Jake Paul	Himself	8 episodes
2019	Conspiracy Series with Shane Dawson	Himself	3 episodes
2019	The Return of Eugenia Cooney	Himself	1 episode
2019–2020	The Beautiful World of Jeffree Star	Himself	8 episodes
2022	The New World of Jeffree Star	Himself	3 episodes

=== Podcasts ===
Year	Title	Role	Notes
2013–2017	Shane and Friends	Host	140 episodes
2022–present	The Shane Dawson Podcast	Host	59 episodes (ongoing)

== Discography ==
=== Singles ===
List of singles, with selected chart positions and certifications
Year	Title	Peak chart positions
Year	Title	UK Indie
2011	"Hey, Suup!?" (featuring Eric Stuff Production)	—
2012	"Superluv!"	16
2012	"The Vacation Song"	—
2012	"We Are Never Ever Getting Back Together (Spoof)" (featuring Wendy McColm)	—
2012	"High School: The Rap"	—
2012	"Maybe This Christmas"	—
2013	"I Knew You Were Trouble – Spoof" (featuring Wendy McColm)	—
2013	"F**k Up"	—
2013	"82 (Spoof of 22 By Taylor Swift)" (featuring Wendy McColm)	—
2013	"Birthday Spoof"	—
2013	"Applause Parody"	—
2013	"Wrecking Ball Spoof" (featuring Kristin Findley)	—
2013	"This Christmas Life"	—
2014	"Blank Space Parody"	—
2015	"Famous YouTuber"	—
2017	"You Didn't Glow Up" (featuring Ryland Adams)	—
2017	"Girlish Body"	—
"—" denotes a recording that failed to chart or was not released in that territory

== Bibliography ==
- I Hate Myselfie (2015)
- It Gets Worse: A Collection of Essays (2016)

== Awards and nominations ==
Year	Award	Category	Nominee(s)	Result	Ref.
2010	Streamy Awards	Best Vlogger	Himself	Won	
2010	Teen Choice Awards	Choice Web Star	Himself	Won	
2011	Teen Choice Awards	Choice Web Star	Himself	Nominated	
2017	People's Choice Awards	Favorite YouTube Star	Himself	Nominated	
2017	Streamy Awards	Creator of the Year	Himself	Nominated	
2017	Streamy Awards	Best First Person Channel	Himself	Nominated	
2018	Streamy Awards	Collaboration	"Switching Lives With A Blind Person", with Molly Burke	Nominated	
2018	Streamy Awards	Creator of the Year	Himself	Won	
2018	Streamy Awards	Documentary	The Truth About Tanacon	Won	
2018	Streamy Awards	Editing	The Truth About Tanacon, with Andrew Siwicki	Won	
2018	People's Choice Awards	The Social Star of 2018	Himself	Won	
2019	The Shorty Awards	YouTuber of the Year	Himself	Won	
2019	Streamy Awards	Documentary	Himself	Won	

== See also ==
- List of entertainers who performed in blackface
