= FilmOn =

Internet-based television provider

- Website type: Television, Video-on-demand
- Available in: English, Hindi
- Owners: FilmOn.TV Inc, Alki David
- Website: www.filmon.com
- Commercial: Yes
- Launched: January 2009 (UK); September 2010 (USA)
- Current status: Live

FilmOn is an Internet-based television provider owned by FilmOn.TV Networks Inc. Alki David had founded FilmOn.TV Networks in 2006. The company was involved in a prolonged legal case concerning streaming rights with CBS, Fox, and NBC between 2013 and 2017, with FilmOn ultimately settling.

== History ==
=== Early broadcasting model ===
FilmOn.TV Networks was founded by owner Alki David in 2006.

In 2010 FilmOn launched a streaming internet TV service for mobile devices. Filmon.com claimed it was going to launch an additional over-the-air distribution model using FilmOn AIR, a portable tuner that was supposed to send over-the-air HD channels to mobile devices and computers. At the time, FilmOn's annual subscription was approximately $149.95. In November 2010, major broadcasting studios won a temporary restraining order against FilmOn.com plc in New York, arguing it was violating copyright law by streaming local broadcasts.

In May 2012, FilmOn launched its Facebook app. At the time, the app had 120 channels, with 2,000 on demand titles. For a beta testing stage, all channels were free of charge, as was recording functionality. With Alki David stating the FilmOn technology had been majorly changed by the summer of 2012, at that time, FilmOn was sued again by major networks. FilmOn paid the networks $1.6 million to resolve the 2012 lawsuit.

In November 2012, FilmOn founder Alki David sued Fox Broadcasting in a Los Angeles Superior Court, arguing Fox had allegedly "libeled David’s company, FilmOn.com, by making false statements and misrepresenting past court orders to third parties including Apple, Google and Microsoft." At the time, the FilmOn board included individuals such as Charlie Sheen and Ice-T, among others. In October 2012, FilmOn had 85 employees and operated out of Beverly Hills. The company made around $24 million a year, with subscribers at that time paying between $11.95 and $17.90 a month for access. FIlmOn also was licensed to companies like Lenova, with plans for its app to be preloaded on Lenova computers.

=== 2012-2023 ===
In February 2014, FilmOn introduced what it called "teleport technology" in the US that would allow users to watch local television broadcasts not in their region. FilmOn's business model at the time involved making money by selling advertising, as well as providing access to high-definition video, among other services, according to the Financial Times. However, it was restricted by ongoing court battles from offering major network television in various locations in the United States. It had 350 live television channels, and also had original programming. In July 2015, FilmOn served as the production company behind a new single and music video by artist Chief Keef.

CBS, Fox and NBC sued FilmOn in the United States for copyright violations in 2013. While Aereo went bankrupt under a similar lawsuit, FilmOn had argued that "since the high court justices likened streaming operations to a cable system, it was entitled to a compulsory license" under Section 111 of the Copyright Act, and that it had tendered appropriate fees to the Copyright Office. In July 2016, FilmOn in California won a case agreeing with its interpretation, which "represented a threat to broadcasters", according to the Hollywood Reporter. In March 2017, that ruling in favor of FilmOn was reversed, and afterwards, FilmOn continued to appeal. CBS, Fox and NBC settled with FilmOn in May 2017. The settlement resulted in FilmOn withdrawing its appeals to other circuits. Terms were confidential.

On 1 May 2017, all channels were set to "Paid" - both SD and HD quality - which restricts viewing time to 2 minutes. Previously, SD quality channels were mostly free. Alki David remained head of FilmOn Networks in December 2019.

== Programming ==
FilmOn is a subscription-based internet-based television service allowing remote computer viewing of local television. It also allows users to create their own live or video-on-demand channels. At one point, the service licensed 600 channels along with 90,000 video-on-demand titles.

The channel lineup varies depending on country. Its library has included the CineBx and Allied Film libraries. FilmOn launched Shockmasters, a channel devoted to Alfred Hitchcock, in 2013. In 2014, FilmOn launched Bloodzillathon, a channel devoted to kaiju movies, and it also began streaming Voice of America in 2014.

== Legal issues ==
In a case that was projected to "impact free speech cases in California," in May 2019, the Supreme Court of California gave FilmOn the go-ahead to sue DoubleVerify for trade libel. The ruling reversed a lower court's decision supporting DoubleVerify's invocation of the anti-SLAPP statute.

In February 2017, a former employee of FilmOn sued both FilmOn and Alki David, saying David had assaulted her in the workplace, and then fired her for refusing advances. She was awarded $11 million in April 2019 by a jury.

In November 2019, a Los Angeles jury awarded $8.25 million in damages to a former FilmOn employee, with FilmOn owner Alki David held liable for battery, sexual battery, and sexual harassment. According to a legal expert quoted in the Los Angeles Times, the award was "among the highest ever for an employment case." The former production assistant was then awarded $58 million from David in punitive damages.

=== Broadcast channel rights ===
FilmOn and Alki David have been involved in several legal issues over programming including the carriage of major U.S. broadcast channels, such as CBS (and its sister network, The CW), NBC, ABC and FOX (and its sister network, MyNetworkTV), among others. This resulted in requiring FilmOn to drop these channels in 2011. In 2012, the channels were all returned after appeals were lodged in Federal Court and FilmOn launched its FilmOn Air X antenna farm. On 5 September 2013, Judge Rosemary M. Collyer of the United States District Court for the District of Columbia issued a nationwide injunction blocking FilmOn from offering its antenna/DVR service. However, the ruling did not apply in the Second Circuit (which includes the states of New York, Vermont, and Connecticut) due to an earlier case brought by Aereo one of FilmOn's competitors.

The 2014-Second Circuit ruling found FilmOn in contempt of a 2012 injunction for continuing to deliver live TV streaming services after the U.S. Supreme Court deemed Aereo's service to be in violation of broadcast copyrights in American Broadcasting Cos. v. Aereo, Inc. (2014). Following the 2014 contempt of court ruling by the Second Circuit, FilmOn was also barred from transmitting broadcast television in the Central District of California and thus remained barred nationwide.

As of July 2015, the company went by FilmOn X LLC in the United States in the then ongoing case Fox Television Stations, Inc v. FilmOn X, LLC. That month, a US judge ruled that internet streaming services like FilmOn should be treated as a normal cable system. It was the first ruling to view a streaming service as a cable provider. The studios appealed. Specifically, in July 2015, George H. Wu, Judge for the Central District of California ruled that FilmOn could qualify for a compulsory license for television content. However, as of late April 2016, the legal issue remained unsettled. Although it had granted judgment in FilmOn's favor, the Central District of California court maintained its preliminary injunction barring the company's streaming services pending the outcome of the appeal. CBS, Fox and NBC settled with FilmOn in May 2017.
