= Patrick Godfrey =

British actor (1933–2026)

- Godfrey in Time Destroys Itself (2017)
- Born: Patrick Lindesay Archibald Godfrey; 13 February 1933; Finsbury, London, England
- Died: 4 June 2026 (aged 93)
- Occupation: Actor
- Spouse: Amanda Walker (m. 1960)
- Children: 2

Patrick Lindesay Archibald Godfrey (13 February 1933 – 4 June 2026) was a British actor.

== Early life and career ==
Patrick Lindesay Archibald Godfrey was born in Finsbury, London, on 13 February 1933, to the Rev. Frederick Godfrey and Lois Mary Gladys (née Turner).

In 1956 Godfrey joined the Radio Drama Company by winning the Carleton Hobbs Bursary. He made his film debut in Miss Julie (1972), and appeared in several British films of the 1980s, 1990s and 2000s, including A Room with a View, Maurice, The Remains of the Day, The Importance of Being Earnest, The Count of Monte Cristo, Dimensions and Les Misérables. He also played Leonardo da Vinci in the Cinderella adaptation Ever After alongside Drew Barrymore and Dougray Scott. He had many roles on television, appearing in Doctor Who, Inspector Morse, and other series.

== Personal life and death ==
Godfrey was married to actress Amanda Walker from 20 April 1960 and they had two children. Their daughter Kate Godfrey is Head of Voice for the Royal Shakespeare Company.

Godfrey died at home on 4 June 2026, aged 93.

== Filmography ==
=== Film ===
Year	Title	Role	Notes
1982	The Life and Adventures of Nicholas Nickleby	Jennings and Mr. Kenwigs	
1983	Heat and Dust	Saunders, the Medical Officer	
1985	A Room with a View	The Reverend Mr. Eager	
1986	Clockwise	Headmaster No.6	
1986	Foreign Body	Simons	
1987	Maurice	Simcox	
1988	Manifesto	Dr. Lombrosow	
1988	On the Black Hill	The Auctioneer	
1988	The Girl in a Swing	Coroner	
1992	Black and White		
1993	The Trial	Court Usher	
1993	The Remains of the Day	Spencer	
1993	Genghis Cohn	Deputy Mueller	
1995	Io no spik inglish		
1997	The Gambler	Professor Olkhin	
1998	Ever After	Leonardo da Vinci	
2000	The Miracle Maker	Matthew / Annas	Voice
2001	My brother Tom	Father Felix	
2002	The Count of Monte Cristo	Morrell	
2002	The Importance of Being Earnest	Merriman	
2005	The Headsman	Bertram	
2005	Oliver Twist	Bookseller	
2006	The History Boys	Sleeping Clergyman	
2008	The Duchess	Dr. Neville	
2009	Shadows in the Sun	Dr Calder	
2011	Dimensions	The Professor	
2011	National Theatre Live: Collaborators	Vassily	
2012	Les Miserables	Monsieur Gillenormand	
2013	The Borderlands	Father Calvino	
2014	Mr Turner	Lord Egremont	
2016	National Theatre Live: As You Like It	Adam	
2017	Breathe	Mr. Tolland	
2018	Mowgli: Legend of the Jungle	Wolf Elder (voice)	

=== Television ===
Year	Title	Role	Notes
1964	Mary Barton	Williams	1 episode
1966–71	Doctor Who	Tor/Major Cosworth	Serials: "The Savages" and "The Mind of Evil"
1970	The Six Wives of Henry VIII	Sir Thomas Wriothesley	2 episodes
1970–71	Z-Cars	Mr Devereux / Receptionist	3 episodes
1984	BBC Television Shakespeare	Cominius	Episode: Coriolanus
1987	Miss Marple: Nemesis	Mr. Schuster	2 episodes
1987–96	The Bill	Various	3 episodes
1993	Inspector Morse	Dr Greer	Episode: Deadly Slumber
2000	Casualty	Larry Clarke	Episode: "Marking Time"
2002	Foyle's War	Ernst Bannerman	Episode: "The White Feather"
2002	Midsomer Murders	Dudley Carew	Episode: "Murder on St. Malley's Day"
2003	My Family	Barry Hall	Episode: "Sixty Feet Under"
2007	2057	John Gater	Episode: "The City"
2007	Doc Martin	Mr Cleary	Episode: "The Apple Doesn't Fall"
2019	His Dark Materials	Butler	

=== Video games ===
Year	Title	Role
2010	BioShock 2	Buck Raleigh (Multiplayer)
2010	Red Dead Redemption	The Local Population
2018	Red Dead Redemption 2	The Local Pedestrian Population
