= Camilla Rutherford =

English actress and fashion model

- Born: Camilla Claude Rutherford; 20 September 1976 (age 49); Camden, London, England
- Spouse: Rufus Abbott (m. 2003; div. 2007)
- Children: 4

Camilla Rutherford (born 20 September 1976) is an English actress and fashion model.

== Early life ==
Camilla Rutherford was born to (Gordon) Malcolm Rutherford (1939–1999), a financial journalist for the Financial Times and sometime advisor to Margaret Thatcher, and his second wife, Elizabeth (née Pelen), a magistrate, daughter of a French ambassador. She was educated at St George's School, Ascot and Woodbridge School before studying maths at Newcastle University, which she left to focus on modelling.

== Acting career ==
Her first film roles were in the short films, Je t'aime John Wayne and in Stardom. In 2001, she played Isobel in Gosford Park. In March 2004, she appeared in a new play called Three Women. She is in the films Vanity Fair (2004) and The Freediver. She portrayed Jocasta in the series Rome and had a role in The Darjeeling Limited. Rutherford starred in the multi-award-winning 1920s/1930s sci-fi Dimensions. She starred in ‘'Breathe'’, which premiered at the London Film Festival. Rutherford starred in the period film Phantom Thread, and as Diana Napier in the 2021 miniseries A Very British Scandal.

== Personal life ==
Rutherford has two children from her first marriage (dissolved) and two children from a second relationship.

== Filmography ==
=== Film ===
Year	Title	Role	Notes
2001	Picture Claire	Cynthia Lacey	
2001	Gosford Park	Isobel McCordle	
2004	Vanity Fair	Lady Gaunt	
2004	The Freediver	Danai	
2006	Land of the Blind	Tania	
2007	The Darjeeling Limited	Alice	
2008	The Edge of Love	Nicolette	
2011	Dimensions	Jane	
2016	Alleycats	Anne Yates	
2017	Breath	Katherine Robinson	
2017	Phantom Thread	Johanna	
2019	Yesterday	Hilary	
2019	Hurt by Paradise	Estelle	
2021	The Vanishing Time	Erin Watson	
2021	Father of Flies	Coral	
2021	A Bird Flew In	Rebecca	
2023	Club Zero	Fred's mother	

=== Television ===
Year	Title	Role	Notes
2007	Rome	Jocasta	Season 2
2011	The Crimson Petal and the White	Mrs. Amphlett	
2014	Fleming: The Man Who Would Be Bond	Loelia Lindsay	
2021	A Very British Scandal	Diana Napier	
