= Sloane U'Ren =

American art director

- Occupations: Art director; director; set designer
- Spouse: Ant Neely

Sloane U'Ren is a British-American Director, Art Director, and Set Designer based in the UK. In 2012 she made her directorial debut with the multi-award winning feature film Dimensions (2011 film), a.k.a. Dimensions: A Line, A Loop, A Tangle of Threads. Dimensions was voted Best Film 2012 at the 37th Boston Science Fiction Film Festival and awarded the Gort Award. Previous Gort Award winners have included Duncan Jones' Moon. Dimensions went on to win Best Film at the London Independent Film Festival and Best Film at the Long Island International Film Expo. U'Ren was also awarded Best Director at the Long Island International Film Expo.

She is married to the English screenwriter and composer Ant Neely.

== Partial filmography ==
- Dimensions (2012) – Director
- Shanghai (2010) – Art Director
- Harry Potter and the Half Blood Prince (2009) – Art Director
- Tsunami: The Aftermath (2006) – Art Director
- The Good Shepherd (2006) – Assistant Art Director
- Batman Begins (2006) – Assistant Art Director
- Six Feet Under (2003) – Set Designer (12 Episodes)
- Open Range (2003) – Set Designer
- Ali (2001) – Set Designer
- The Patriot (2000) – Set Designer
- Mission: Impossible 2 (2000) – Set Designer
- Scream 3 (2000) – Set Designer
- Being John Malkovich (1999) – Set Designer
