= Not Cool (film) =

2014 film by Shane Dawson

- Theatrical release poster
- Directed by: Shane Dawson
- Written by: Dan Schoffer
- Produced by: Lauren Schnipper; Shane Dawson; Josh Shader
- Starring: Cherami Leigh; Shane Dawson; Drew Monson; Michelle Veintimilla
- Cinematography: Frank Paladino
- Edited by: Shane Dawson
- Music by: Joseph Carillo
- Production companies: The Chair; Steeltown Entertainment Project; Point Park University; The WQED Steeltown Incubator; Shaderville
- Distributed by: Starz Digital Media
- Release date: September 19, 2014
- Running time: 93 minutes
- Country: United States
- Language: English
- Budget: $800,000
- Box office: $36,026 (US)

Not Cool is a 2014 American romantic teen comedy film directed and edited by Shane Dawson (in his feature directorial debut), written by Dan Schoffer, and produced by Lauren Schnipper, Dawson, and Josh Shader. The film centers on a group of high school friends reuniting over their Thanksgiving break during college. Along with Hollidaysburg, it is one of two films that were produced for the Starz reality competition show The Chair, where the competitors use the same screenplay to create their film. The film stars Cherami Leigh, Shane Dawson, Drew Monson, Michelle Veintimilla, Lisa Schwartz, and Bill Laing. The film grossed $36,026 in the US against an $800,000 budget and received negative reviews. As of 2026, it is Dawson's only directed feature film.

== Plot ==
During Thanksgiving break in Pittsburgh, sardonic freshman Tori—who narrates—returns home just as former prom king Scott is abruptly dumped by his hyperactive girlfriend, Heather. Reconnecting unexpectedly, Tori (who has shed her high-school “geek” image) and Scott tentatively test a romance while confronting their reputations and unresolved hurts from the past. In a parallel thread, Scott’s younger sister Janie navigates a tentative flirtation with classmate Joel, whose overeager attempts to impress her lead to comic misfires. Over a week of parties, family gatherings, and holiday distractions, a humiliating party incident involving Heather strains Tori and Scott before both pairs reconsider what they want from each other by the end of the break.

== Cast ==
- Cherami Leigh as Tori, an 18-year-old girl who is the main character and narrator. She is known to be downbeat and suicidal but then falls for her old bully, Scott, who has changed since high school.
- Shane Dawson as Scott, an 18-year-old, who starts to develop feelings for one of his old high school victims after he notices she has changed.
- Drew Monson as Joel, an 18-year-old nerdy "player" who has feelings for Scott's younger sister Janie.
- Michelle Veintimilla as Janie, a 17-year-old popular girl and Scott's younger sister who looks all put together on the outside but is lonely on the inside.
- Lisa Schwartz as Marisa, Tori's successful, blind 22-year-old sister, who is marrying Gil, who Tori considers a "freak show/nutjob."
- Bill Laing as Ray, Scott and Janie's father, who is selling his store that Scott and Janie love and Joel works at, so he can be with a woman named Anastasia.
- Jorie Kosel as Heather, Scott's erratic and hyper ex-girlfriend who is obsessed with sex and anything that involves sex. She forces herself on Scott at a party, humiliating Tori when she walks in on them.

== Production ==
Not Cool is one of two films sponsored by the Starz reality competition show The Chair, the other being Anna Martemucci's Hollidaysburg. The films vied for a $250,000 prize based on multi-platform voting system. The film cost $800,000 and took 20 days to shoot.

== Release ==
The film was released through Starz Digital Media theatrically on September 19, 2014.

The film was released digitally on September 23, 2014. Upon its digital release, Not Cool reached #5 on the iTunes movie chart within hours, according to the online-video trade outlet Tubefilter.

== Reception ==
On Rotten Tomatoes the film has an approval rating of 14% based on seven reviews and an average rating of 2.1/10. On Metacritic, the film has a weighted average score of 1 out of 100 based on four reviews, indicating "overwhelming dislike". This puts the film among the lowest rated films on Metacritic.

Frank Schreck of The Hollywood Reporter wrote, "Filled with ethnic stereotypes, scatological humor, profane language and characters who are not so much caricatures as cartoons, Not Cool well lives up to its title." Neil Genzlinger of The New York Times wrote that the "characters are vile; the acting is terrible (Mr. Dawson, who has had some YouTube success, cast himself in a leading role); the tone is a confusing mishmash; and there’s not an original thought or joke in the thing." The Los Angeles Times called the film "an abyss, an insult to the craft of filmmaking, storytelling and entertainment in almost every way."

On the final episode of The Chair, broadcast on November 8, 2014, it was revealed that Dawson's film won the prize. The results were tabulated with SurveyMonkey, where Not Cool averaged 63 out of 100 in comparison to Martemucci's film which averaged 58. In total, 39% of the votes cast were disqualified for lack of evidence that the voter viewed both films. Chris Moore, executive producer of The Chair, noted that Dawson's film was mainstream. The Chair producer Zachary Quinto called Dawson's film "ultimately a vapid waste of time," but was "glad Shane won — he set out to do what he wanted to do."

While overall critical reception was largely negative, a few reviewers were more favorable. Elias Savada of Film Threat awarded the film 4 out of 5 stars, calling it “brazen, shameless, romantic, and broadly funny” and concluding “Not Cool is way cool,” while also praising its “bright, pulsating look” and editing. Mike McGranaghan of Aisle Seat gave the film 2.5 out of 4, writing that “Sometimes the movie is funny, other times eye-roll inducing.”
