= The Freediver =

2004 British drama film by Alki David

- Directed by: Alki David
- Written by: Alki David
- Starring: Alki David; Camilla Rutherford
- Release date: 9 January 2004
- Running time: 95 min
- Country: United Kingdom
- Language: English

The Freediver is a 2004 British drama film written and directed by Alki David.

== Cast ==
- Alki David - Hector
- Adam Baldwin - Dr. Viades
- Camilla Rutherford - Danai
- Dominique Swain - Maggie
- Judd Nelson - Ziad
- James Fox - Sebastian Nagel
