= Cecil U'ren =

English cricketer (1903–1971)

Personal information
- Full name: Cecil William Edward U'ren
- Born: 9 November 1903; Devonport, Devon, England
- Died: 29 May 1971 (aged 67); Sutton, Surrey, England
- Batting: Unknown
- Bowling: Unknown

Domestic team information
- Years: Team
- 1941/42–1943/44: Europeans

Career statistics
Competition	First-class
Matches	2
Runs scored	14
Batting average	4.66
100s/50s	–/–
Top score	10*
Balls bowled	282
Wickets	1
Bowling average	181.00
5 wickets in innings	–
10 wickets in match	–
Best bowling	1/93
Catches/stumpings	–/–
- Source: ESPNcricinfo, 26 November 2022

Cecil William Edward U'ren (9 November 1903 – 29 May 1971) was an English first-class cricketer and an officer in the Indian Imperial Police.

U'ren was born at Devonport in November 1903. He joined the Indian Imperial Police in British India as an assistant superintendent in Bombay in December 1924, remaining in this rank until February 1932, when he became officiating superintendent. He was appointed officiating deputy commander of police in Bombay in February 1936, and was conferred the rank of superintendent in October 1939. U'ren was awarded the Indian Police Medal in 1941, before being appointed deputy commander of Special Branch in India. While in British India, he played first-class cricket for the Europeans cricket team on two occasions in the Bombay Pentangular against the Parsees in 1941 and the Hindus in 1943. He scored 14 runs in his two matches, with a highest score of 10 not out, while with his bowling he took a single wicket. U'Ren was awarded the King's Police Medal in the 1947 Birthday Honours, in recognition of distinguished service. He later returned to England, where he died at Sutton in May 1971.
