= Lisa Schwartz =

American author, actress and YouTube personality (born 1983)

- Born: Lisa Erin Schwartz; April 4, 1983 (age 43); Tarzana, Los Angeles, California, U.S.
- Occupations: Author; actress; YouTube personality
- Spouse: Jeff Galante (m. 2021)
- Children: 1

YouTube information
- Channel: lisbug
- Years active: 1998–present
- Subscribers: 1.96 million
- Views: 16.3 million
- Last updated: December 27, 2025

Lisa Erin Schwartz (born April 4, 1983) is an American author, actress and YouTube personality. Schwartz starred in Not Cool (2014), the TV film My Profile Story (2009), and the ABC digital series This Isn't Working (2016). She provided the voice of Talking Angela in the Talking Tom & Friends web series, which has been broadcast on YouTube, television in various countries outside the United States and ran for five seasons.

== Career ==
Schwartz began her YouTube channel, Lisbug, in April 2007. She has since worked with Seventeen, Yahoo!, Maker Studios, and appeared in YouTube personality and director Shane Dawson's 2014 film, Not Cool. With Dawson, she also advocated against cyberbullying.

She is also the voice of Talking Angela in the Talking Tom & Friends animated series and on February 2, 2016, celebrated her character's birthday. She is the co-creator of and actress in the Maker Studios and New Form Productions original series Party Girl.

In September 2016, Schwartz announced that she created a show called This Isn't Working with ABC Digital. She plays the lead role of Sarah Turner, who works in temporary jobs to support her career dream as an actress.

=== Publications ===
On August 27, 2019, Schwartz released her first memoir, Thirty-Life Crisis: Navigating My Thirties, One Drunk Baby Shower at a Time. Its foreword was written by YouTuber Shane Dawson. Schwartz promoted the book at a Barnes & Noble at The Grove at Farmers Market in Los Angeles. The book promotes itself as a "hilarious essay collection perfect for anyone dealing with the challenges, indignities, and celebrations that come with being a thirty-something".

== Personal life ==
Schwartz is Jewish. Her mother's name is Jennifer and her grandmother's name is Virginia, and both appeared in the Elders React series by Fine Brothers Entertainment. Schwartz dated YouTube personality Shane Dawson from December 2011 to 2015. In June 2020, a video resurfaced of her and Shane Dawson making inappropriate jokes about Dawson's cousin, who was 12 at the time. Both she and Dawson received backlash and Schwartz issued an apology the same day. In November 2019, Schwartz announced on her YouTube channel that she got engaged to comedian Jeff Galante. On November 8, 2021, she married Galante in a small ceremony. They have one child, a daughter, born in 2023.

== Filmography ==
=== Film ===
Year	Title	Role	Notes
2009	My Profile Story	Jenny	TV movie
2014	Not Cool	Marisa	
2020	Faith Based	Lisa	

=== Television ===
Year	Title	Role	Notes
2011	It's Always Sunny in Philadelphia	Movie Theater Usher	
2014–2021	Talking Tom & Friends	Angela, various roles	Web series
2016	This Isn't Working	Sarah	
2024	Abbott Elementary	Charlie's Mom	

== Bibliography ==
- Lisa Schwartz (2019), Thirty-Life Crisis: Navigating My Thirties, One Drunk Baby Shower at a Time, New York, New York: Grand Central Publishing, ISBN 9781538763100
