= It Gets Worse: A Collection of Essays =

2016 book by Shane Dawson

- Author: Shane Dawson
- Genre: Autobiography
- Published: 2016 (Keywords Press)
- Publisher: Keywords Press, an imprint of Simon & Schuster
- ISBN: 978-1-5011-3284-1

It Gets Worse: A Collection of Essays is a book by American YouTuber Shane Dawson released on July 19, 2016. Dawson released a short film of the same name along with the book. In Bustle, Alex Weiss describes the collection as narrating a range of events in Dawson's life "from his most bizarre moments of childhood to dressing in drag for the first time, from clashes with celebs to coming to terms with his bisexuality and how he comes out to people."

It Gets Worse debuted with first week sales of more than 26,000 copies. The book made the New York Times Bestseller list at number one in the paperback nonfiction category. and was the number three best-selling book in the United States for the week of August 1, 2016.
