= Petra, Cyprus =

Petra: Πέτρα (Greek); Taşköy (Turkish)
- Location within Cyprus
- Coordinates: 35°06′31″N 32°54′28″E
- Country (de jure): Cyprus
  - District: Nicosia District
- Country (de facto): Northern Cyprus
  - District: Lefke District
- Time zone: UTC+2 (EET)
  - Summer (DST): UTC+3 (EEST)

Petra (Greek: Πέτρα, lit: 'stone'; Turkish: Petre or Taşköy, lit: 'stone village') is a former village in Cyprus, now uninhabited and largely destroyed. It is located east of the town of Lefka and just north the Green Line. De facto, Petra is under the control of Northern Cyprus.

Petra had a mixed Greek and Turkish Cypriot population with a Greek Cypriot majority. Some of the village has been used as a military camp.
