= Gooby =

2009 comedy fantasy drama film by Wilson Coneybeare

- Film poster
- Directed by: Wilson Coneybeare
- Written by: Wilson Coneybeare
- Produced by: Wilson Coneybeare
- Starring: Robbie Coltrane; David James Elliott; Matthew Knight; Ingrid Kavelaars; Eugene Levy
- Cinematography: Michael Storey
- Edited by: Ellen Fine
- Music by: Kevin Lau; Ronald Royer
- Production company: Coneybeare Stories Inc.
- Distributed by: E1 Entertainment
- Release date: 17 April 2009
- Running time: 95 minutes
- Country: Canada
- Language: English
- Budget: $6.5 million
- Box office: $3,235

Gooby (also known as A Ted Named Gooby) is a 2009 Canadian fantasy comedy drama film written and directed by Wilson Coneybeare featuring Robbie Coltrane as the voice of Gooby, a living teddy bear, and Matthew Knight as Willy, an 11-year-old boy who is scared of his new house.

== Plot ==
Willy is an 11-year-old boy who believes weird creatures are lurking, just waiting to attack him. He believes that the only thing keeping him safe is his house. When his parents decide to move, Willy isn't thrilled with the idea of going to a new school and living in a strange home. One day, Gooby, a teddy bear that Willy had as a little boy, arrives at the new home. This version of Gooby is nearly six feet tall, able to talk, and wants to help; Willy decides that the two will be friends, but he must hide Gooby from his parents.

Left alone for long hours while Willy goes to school, Gooby is frequently bored. He passes the time by causing trouble, convincing the nanny that there are critters inside the house, stealing cookies from the kitchen, ransacking the garage for parts to build Willy's fantasy racer and sneaking around Willy's school where anyone could see him. When Willy's teacher goes on maternity leave, she is replaced by Mr. Nerdlinger, a children's book writer who desperately wants to become famous. When he catches sight of Gooby, he becomes determined to photograph him. Willy has trouble making friends, and when Gooby's appearance outside Mr. Nerdlinger's class makes Willy freak out (earning him and three of his classmates two weeks of after school detention), his reputation at school is only worsened. On Halloween day, Willy and Gooby go out during daylight to have fun (Willy convinces Gooby to pretend to be Willy's father in a costume) and Willy makes friends with the most popular kids in school by having Gooby buy them all tickets to an R-rated action movie. Gooby becomes envious of Willy when he begins to spend more time with his newfound friends. The two get into an argument, resulting in Gooby running away.

Willy's grades start to drop, and his parents begin to worry. When Gooby eventually returns one night, he convinces Willy to follow him to a surprise location. Willy's parents notice that their son is missing and call the police, but meanwhile Gooby shows Willy what he has discovered: his father's childhood home. While exploring it, Willy gets scared to the point of falling backwards, breaking through the floor and catching a metal pipe too far down for Gooby to help him up. Gooby uses Willy's cellphone to call his father, who comes to the rescue. After saving Willy, Gooby talks to Mr. Dandrige and reminds him of how when he was a child his father never spent enough time with him. Willy's mother and father decide to stop working so hard and focus more on their son. One day, while shopping for materials to build Willy a playhouse, the family foils Mr. Nerdlinger's attempt to get pictures of Gooby when Willy notices that Gooby has wandered off. Gooby explains to Willy that now that he is happy and no longer so alone (and afraid of imaginary creatures), it's time for Gooby to move on and help another child. Gooby transforms back into a teddy bear and Willy offers him to a little girl who is being ignored by her parents.

== Cast of characters ==
- Robbie Coltrane as Gooby (voice)
  - Derek Scott as Gooby
- David James Elliott as Jack Dandridge
- Ingrid Kavelaars as Elize Dandridge
- Matthew Knight as Willy Dandridge
- Eugene Levy as Mr. Nerdlinger
- Mary Haney as Mrs. Williams
- Len Doncheff as Mr. Ogilvey
- Paula Boudreau as Mrs. Deacon
- Elle Downs as Mrs. Donnelly
- Ricky Hegarty as Colin
- Alexander Conti as Eric
- Luke Bilyk as Cute Kid
- Jack Duffy as Grocery Store Manager
- Daniel DeSanto as Crane
- Avery Bisbee as Little Girl

== Reception ==
Review aggregation website Rotten Tomatoes rates it 20% positive ("rotten") based on five reviews. The Kansas City Star said that "instead of inspiring children to be brave and loving, it will most likely send them cowering under the covers in terror."

In 2019, YouTubers Drew Gooden, Danny Gonzalez, and Kurtis Conner made a video with a segment in which they reacted to trailer of the film, and later, the 3 uploaded a video of them watching the full movie. These videos brought attention to the film, where it gained a small cult following among fans of the YouTubers.
