= Cimorelli =

American a cappella singing group

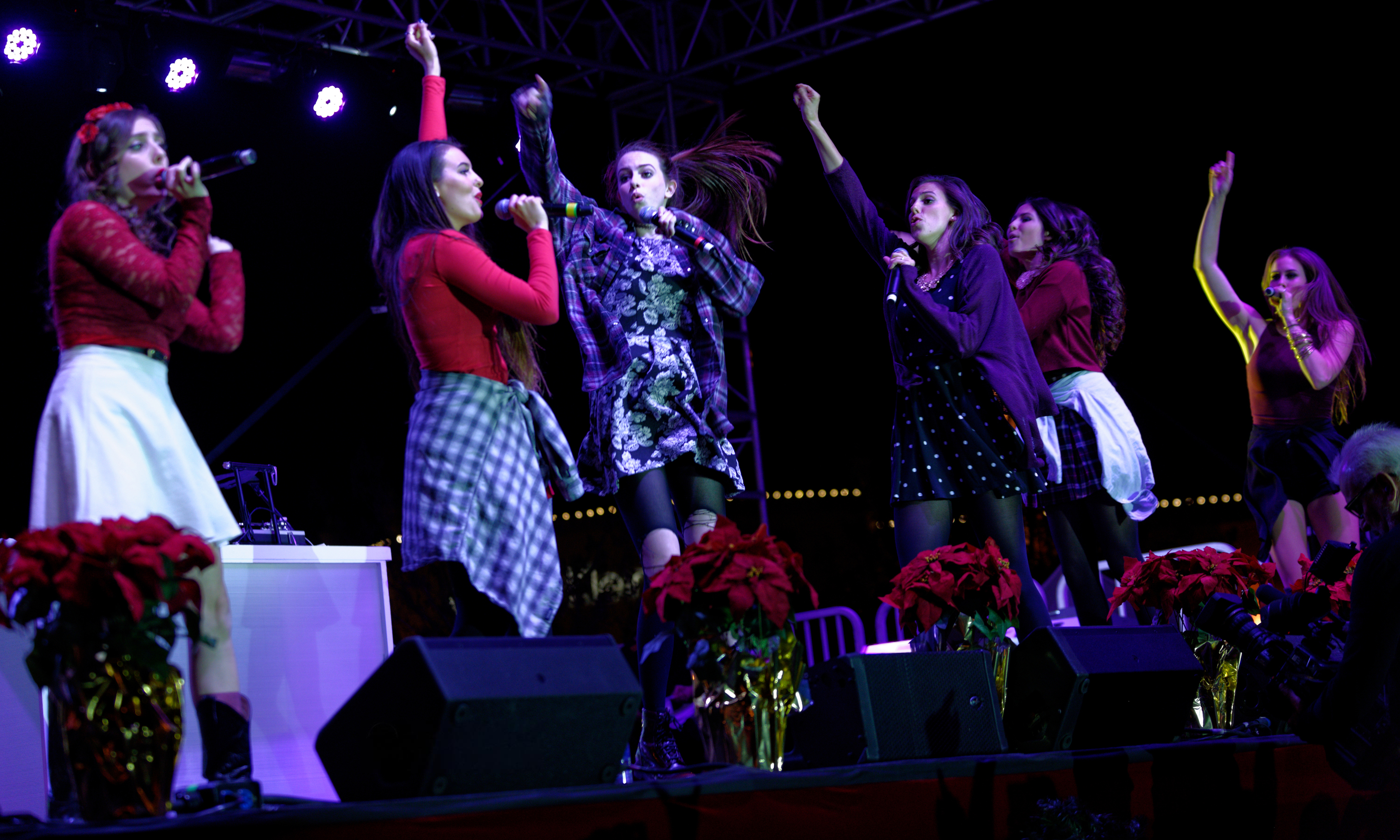
- Cimorelli performing in 2014

Background information
- Origin: El Dorado Hills, California, U.S.
- Genres: Vocal group, teen pop, pop
- Years active: 2007–present
- Labels: Island Records; Republic Records; Cimorelli Music; Eleven Productions
- Members: Christina Cimorelli; Katherine Cimorelli; Lisa Cimorelli; Amy Cimorelli; Lauren Cimorelli
- Past members: Mike Cimorelli Jr.; Dani Cimorelli
- Website: www.cimorellimusic.com

Cimorelli is an American singing group from El Dorado Hills, California, consisting of five sisters: Christina, Katherine, Lisa, Amy, and Lauren. They first gained popularity on YouTube singing cover music and were subsequently signed to Universal Music's Island Records and Republic Records labels in 2009. Their oldest brother, Mike Jr., was a member of the group from 2007 to 2008, while their youngest sister Dani was a member from 2010 to 2020. The group's sound is mainly family-friendly pop music with tight harmonies and occasional band instruments. Their lyrics are centered on the themes of self-worth, friendship, love, heartbreak, and their Christian faith.

Cimorelli is now an independent band and reside in Nashville, Tennessee.

As of October 2022, they have released nine extended plays, three full-length albums titled Up at Night, Alive, and Sad Girls Club, a mixtape called Hearts on Fire, and two Christmas compilation albums.

== Members ==
Members are listed from oldest to youngest, along with roles other than vocals:

- Christina Cimorelli: founder, leader, arrangements, songwriter, producer, pianist (since 2007)
- Katherine Cimorelli: bassist, songwriter (since 2007)
- Lisa Cimorelli: arrangements, songwriter, producer, pianist, percussionist, video editor (since 2007)
- Amy Cimorelli: guitarist, pianist, songwriter (since 2007)
- Lauren Cimorelli: songwriter, producer, pianist (since 2007)

=== Former members ===
- Michael "Mike" Cimorelli Jr: guitarist (2007–2008)
- Danielle "Dani" Cimorelli: guitarist, songwriter, producer, graphic designer, video editor, pianist (2010–2020)

== Early life and education ==
The Cimorelli sisters grew up in a Catholic and home-schooled family consisting of 13 people: their dad, mom, and five brothers. Their mother, Lynne, is a composer, classical pianist, and choir director who taught her children to harmonize, sing, and play the piano. All of the sisters have attended community college for at least one semester, with the exception of Amy.

== Personal life ==
=== Catholicism and religion ===
Cimorelli is born and raised Catholic. They believe their Catholic faith is extremely important to them and it is the driving force behind everything they do. Their religious beliefs influence several aspects of their personal life, such as not using profanity in their music or in everyday life, waiting until marriage, and not using birth control.

On July 9, 2017, Lisa and singer-songwriter Lauren Jauregui got into an argument on Twitter after Jauregui criticized the Catholic Church for its historically homophobic and controversial views. Cimorelli rebutted by stating that not all Catholics have the same views.

Cimorelli supports the pro-life movement and has attended its annual marches. On January 17, 2019, Cimorelli performed at an event with the Franciscan Friars of the Renewal to raise awareness of the movement.

=== Health ===
Seven out of the eleven Cimorelli siblings, including Katherine, Amy, Lauren and Dani, were born with brachydactyly, a condition which causes their fingers to be abnormally short and crooked.

Amy was diagnosed with mosaic Turner syndrome at the age of nine.

Christina was diagnosed with a genetic blood clotting disorder after experiencing a miscarriage in her first pregnancy in 2019.

Katherine was diagnosed with an eating disorder in 2020 and is in recovery. She was also diagnosed with Pre-eclampsia during her first pregnancy with her twin boys in 2021.

Lisa was diagnosed with Gestational diabetes during her first pregnancy with her baby girl in 2021.

== Artistry ==
Cimorelli is a pop vocal group that incorporates elements of piano, guitar, drums, and bass into their music. They describe their music as "real, emotional, fun, and expressive". The group is influenced by all the different types of music they listen to: indie, emo, country, soul, and Christian music. As a group, they are inspired by Demi Lovato, Alanis Morissette, Sam Hunt, and Ed Sheeran. The Jonas Brothers, Taylor Swift, JoJo, Ed Sheeran, and Sam Hunt have influenced individual members of the group musically.

== Career ==
=== 2007–2009: Formation and beginnings ===
In 2007, Mike Jr., Christina, Katherine, Lisa, Amy, and Lauren launched Cimorelli as a vocal group. The group sang at small shows around their hometown and the Sacramento area. On December 12, 2008, Cimorelli released their debut EP, Hello There (also known as Cimorelli).

After the release of Hello There, Mike Jr. left the band.

On August 10, 2009, the group (then consisting of Christina, Katherine, Lisa, Amy, and Lauren) uploaded their cover of "Party in the U.S.A.". Following this release Cimorelli began releasing weekly covers. Cimorelli was signed by Island Records and Republic Records in 2009. The family then moved from El Dorado Hills, California to Malibu, California.

=== 2010–2015: Island Records and Republic Records ===
In 2010, their youngest sister, Dani, joined the band.

On December 6, 2011, Cimorelli released their 2nd EP, CimFam. This marked their first release under a major record label. The EP included 5 of Cimorelli's most popular covers and an original song written by all of the girls called Million Bucks. The EP peaked at number 9 on the US Top Heatseekers chart.

In July 2012, Cimorelli was nominated for Choice Web Star at the 2012 Teen Choice Awards. Later that year on December 11, 2012, the group released their 3rd EP, Believe It. The EP consisted of 3 original songs and 1 Christmas cover. The music video for the title track of the EP also premiered on Cimorelli's Vevo channel on the same day. It was directed by music video, commercial, and film director Hannah Lux Davis. The EP peaked at number 7 on the US Top Heatseekers chart.

On June 18, 2013, Cimorelli released their 4th EP, Made in America. The EP consisted of 4 original songs. The music video for the title track of the EP premiered on Cimorelli's Vevo channel a week later on June 26, 2013. It was directed by music video director Erik White. The EP peaked at number 179 on the Billboard 200 chart and at number 4 on the US Top Heatseekers chart. At the 2013 Teen Choice Awards, Cimorelli won the award of Choice Web Star.

During the months of May and June 2014, Cimorelli performed at DigiFest in London, New York City, Toronto, and Minnesota. Later in June 2014 Cimorelli launched their original web series titled Summer with Cimorelli. On October 27, 2014, Cimorelli released their 5th EP, Renegade. The EP consisted of 4 original songs. The EP peaked at number 10 on the US Heatseekers chart. A month later on November 24, 2014, Cimorelli released their 1st Christmas EP and 6th overall EP, Christmas Magic. The EP consisted of 5 Christmas covers.

=== 2015–present: Independent artists ===
Around May 2015, Cimorelli released a mixtape called Hearts on Fire, which included 9 acoustic tracks. This was their first release after departing from Island Records and Republic Records.

On May 17, 2016, Cimorelli released their debut full-length album, Up at Night. It debuted at number 24 on the US Top Country Albums chart and peaked at number 7 on the US Heatseekers chart. The album sold 1,500 copies in the first week in the US. Later that year on December 20, Cimorelli released their 2nd full-length album, Alive. It peaked at number 11 on the US Heatseekers and at number 42 on the Top Christian Albums chart.

On October 27, 2017, Cimorelli released their 3rd album Sad Girls Club. The album features a solo song from each sister, which was a new concept for the group. Sad Girls Club peaked at number 17 on the US Heatseekers chart.

In the summer of 2018, Cimorelli released their 7th EP, I Love You, or Whatever. The EP consisted of 4 songs and 3 spoken word poems read by Katherine, Amy, and Dani. As well, Lisa, Amy, and Dani starred in the indie film Hope Springs Eternal alongside Mia Rose Frampton, Stony Blyden, Lauren Giraldo, and Pej Vahdat. In October 2018, Cimorelli released their 8th EP, Here's to Us: Wedding Song to celebrate the marriage of Christina and her husband Nick. The EP consisted of 4 covers and 3 original songs (2 sung by Christina only and 1 sung by Cimorelli). In November 2018, Cimorelli released their 2nd Christmas EP and 9th overall EP, Christmas Lights. The EP consisted of 2 covers and 2 original songs.

== Discography ==
The discography of Cimorelli consists of nine extended plays, three full-length albums, one mixtape, and two Christmas compilation albums.

=== Studio albums ===
List of studio albums with selected details and chart positions
Title	Album details	Peak chart positions		
Title	Album details	US Heat.	US Country	US Christ.
Up at Night	Release date: May 17, 2016; Label: Eleven Productions LLC; Formats: Digital download, CD	7	24	—
Alive	Release date: December 20, 2016; Label: Eleven Productions LLC; Formats: Digital download, CD	11	—	42
Sad Girls Club	Release date: October 27, 2017; Label: Eleven Productions LLC; Formats: Digital download, CD	17	—	—

=== Compilation albums ===
List of albums
Title	Album details
The Christmas Collection	Release date: December 15, 2017; Label: Eleven Productions LLC, The Fuel Music; Formats: Digital download
Christmas Carols	Release date: October 21, 2022; Label: Eleven Productions LLC, The Fuel Music; Formats: Digital download

=== Extended plays ===
List of EPs with selected details and chart positions
Title	EP details	Peak chart positions	
Title	EP details	US	US Heat.
Hello There/Cimorelli	Release date: December 12, 2008; Label: Independent; Formats: Digital download	—	—
CimFam	Release date: December 4, 2011; Label: Island; Formats: Digital download	—	9
Believe It	Release date: December 11, 2012; Label: Island; Formats: Digital download	—	7
Made in America	Release date: June 18, 2013; Label: Island; Formats: Digital download	179	4
Renegade	Release date: October 27, 2014; Label: Island; Formats: Digital download	—	10
Christmas Magic	Release date: November 24, 2014; Label: Island; Formats: Digital download	—	—
I Love You, or Whatever	Release date: August 1, 2018; Label: Eleven Productions LLC; Formats: Digital download, CD	—	—
Here's to Us: Wedding Songs	Release date: October 22, 2018; Label: Eleven Productions LLC; Formats: Digital download	—	—
Christmas Lights	Release date: November 23, 2018; Label: Eleven Productions LLC; Formats: Digital download	—	—

=== Mixtapes ===
Title	Mixtape details
Hearts on Fire	Release date: May 22, 2015; Label: Eleven Productions LLC; Formats: Digital download

=== Singles ===
Title	Year	Album
"Million Bucks"	2011	CimFam
"Believe It"	2012	Believe It
"Wings"	2012	Believe It
"Made in America"	2013	Made in America
"You're Worth It"	2014	Renegade
"I Got You"	2014	Renegade

== Awards and nominations ==
Year	Award	Category	Result
2012	Teen Choice Awards	Choice Web Star	Nominated
2013	Radio Disney Music Awards	Breakout Star	Nominated
2013	Teen Choice Awards	Choice Web Star	Won
2014	Teen Choice Awards	Choice Web Star: Music	Nominated
2014	Streamy Awards	Musical Artist	Nominated
2015	Teen Choice Awards	Choice Music Group: Female	Nominated
2016	Teen Choice Awards	Choice Web Star: Music	Nominated
2017	Teen Choice Awards	Choice Web Star: Music	Nominated

== Tours ==
- Made in America Radio Tour (2013)
- DigiFest Tour (2014)
- Renegade Tour (2015)
- Hearts on Fire Tour (2015)
- Up at Night Tour (2016)
- I Love You, or Whatever Tour (2018)
- Believe in You Tour (2019)
