= Up at Night =

Up at Night may refer to:

- Up at Night (album), by Cimorelli, 2016
- "Up at Night" (song), by Kehlani featuring Justin Bieber, 2022
