= Camp Unplug =

Series of thirty-six videos on short-form video hosting service, Vine

Camp Unplug was a series of thirty-six Vines which follow thirteen Viners who grudgingly attend a "digital detox camp", filmed at Camp Wandawega. Described as Vine's "first long-form original series", Camp Unplug was released on June 23, 2016, during VidCon, after the six-second limit on Vines was lifted. It was soon looped over 41 million times the following week. It was twenty-two minutes in length. Camp Unplug was written by Viners Aaron Chewning and Chris Melberger, and produced by Jeremy Cabalona and Karyn Spencer. The series was where future collaborators Drew Gooden and Danny Gonzalez first met.

Camp Unplug received three nominations at the 6th Streamy Awards and was a finalist for Web Series at the 9th Shorty Awards.

== Cast ==
Featured Vine stars:

- Demetrius Harmon (MeechOnMars)
- Lauren Giraldo
- Danny Gonzalez
- Cody Ko
- Kenny Knox
- Mikaela Long
- Emily Fan (Not Even Emily)
- Chloe Woodard (Chloe LMAO)
- Dope Island
- Tom Harlock
- Victor Pope Jr.
- Drew Gooden
- Miel Bredouw (Miel Monster)

== Accolades ==
| Year | Award | Category | Nominee(s) | Result | Ref. |
|---|---|---|---|---|---|
| 2016 | 6th Streamy Awards | Show of The Year | Camp Unplug | Nominated | |
| 2016 | 6th Streamy Awards | Ensemble Cast | Camp Unplug | Nominated | |
| 2016 | 6th Streamy Awards | Actress | Lauren Giraldo | Nominated | |
| 2016 | 9th Shorty Awards | Web Series | Camp Unplug | Finalist | |
