= Drew Gooden =

Drew Gooden may refer to:

- Drew Gooden (basketball) (born 1981), American basketball player
- Drew Gooden (internet personality) (born 1993), American commentary YouTuber and comedian

== See also ==
- Drew Gordon (1990–2024), American basketball player
