= I'm a Mess =

"I'm a Mess" may refer to:

- "I'm a Mess" (Bebe Rexha song), 2018
- "I'm a Mess" (Ed Sheeran song), 2014
- "I'm a Mess" (Avril Lavigne and Yungblud song), 2022
- "I'm a Mess", a song from Big Black's 1983 EP Bulldozer
- "I'm a Mess", a song from Nick Lowe's 2001 album The Convincer
- "I'm a Mess", a 2011 song by Jason White
- "I'm a Mess", a song from The Rasmus's eponymous 2012 album
- "I'm a Mess", a song from Cimorelli's 2016 album Up at Night
