= The Reunion (2011 American film) =

- Directed by: Michael Pavone
- Written by: Michael Pavone
- Produced by: David Calloway; Nancy Hirami
- Starring: John Cena; Ethan Embry; Michael Rispoli; Boyd Holbrook; Amy Smart
- Cinematography: Kenneth Zunder
- Edited by: Marc Pollon
- Music by: James A. Johnston
- Production company: WWE Studios
- Distributed by: Samuel Goldwyn Films
- Release date: October 21, 2011
- Running time: 90 minutes
- Country: United States
- Language: English
- Box office: $1.6 million

The Reunion is a 2011 American action film directed by Michael Pavone and starring John Cena, Ethan Embry, Michael Rispoli, Boyd Holbrook, and Amy Smart. The film was released on October 21, 2011. It received negative reviews.

== Plot ==
After the death of her father, Nina (Amy Smart) is charged with fulfilling his last wish – to bring her three brothers back together... Sam (John Cena), a hardened cop currently on suspension; Leo (Ethan Embry), a loudmouthed overbearing bail bondsman; and Douglas (Boyd Holbrook), a handsome 20-year-old thief fresh out of jail. When Leo discovers the con he pledged a lot of money for is suspected of kidnapping one of the wealthiest men in the country, he convinces his two brothers to join him on what will become a dangerous, yet exhilarating adventure.

== Cast ==
- John Cena as Sam Cleary
- Ethan Embry as Leo Cleary
- Boyd Holbrook as Douglas Cleary
- Amy Smart as Nina Cleary
- Michael Rispoli as Marcus Canton
- Gregg Henry as Kyle Wills
- Lela Loren as Theresa Trujillo
- Jack Conley as Jack Nealon
- Carmen Serano as Angelina the stripper

== Production ==
WWE Studios produced the film alongside Samuel Goldwyn Films. Filming took place in Albuquerque, New Mexico in October 2010.

== Home media ==
The film was released on Blu-ray and DVD on November 8, 2011.

== Reception ==
On the review aggregator website Rotten Tomatoes, 8% of 12 critics' reviews are positive, with an average rating of 3.3/10. Metacritic, which uses a weighted average, assigned the film a score of 26 out of 100, based on 11 critics, indicating "generally unfavorable" reviews.
