= Karyn Spencer =

American producer and screenwriter

- Born: United States
- Other name: Karyn Spencer-Murphy
- Occupations: Film producer and writer

Karyn Spencer (born 1976 or 1977) is an American talent agent for social media influencers who has had roles at Vine, AT&T, Target and Whalar. Spencer also co-produced the films Spread (2009) and Killers (2010), both starring Ashton Kutcher.

== Career ==
=== Film producer (2009–2012) ===
Spencer ran the social media accounts of actor Ashton Kutcher and model Tyra Banks. She was an associate producer for the 2009 film Spread. She was also the co-producer of Killers, a 2010 film. In 2012, Spencer left her position as Banks' director of communications to become director of communications at the startup Fancy Hands, seeking to join a company in its early stages. From 2013 to 2015, she became the Vice President of Brands for the agency theAudience.

=== Vine (2015–2017) ===
In 2015, Spencer became the head of creators of Vine, a social media platform for six-second videos which shut down in 2017. She produced Vine's Camp Unplug, a series of thirty-six videos on Vine ("Vines"), which was a finalist at the Shorty Awards for Web Series. In 2017, Spencer served as Vine's Creative Development Lead. She and other representatives from Vine met with eighteen Viners who proposed that if Vine paid them $1.2 million each and rolled out changes to the app, they would make twelve Vines for the company monthly. The deal did not go through and Vine, struggling, was shut down in January. Spencer was also an adviser to Clash in 2021, a successor to Vine, with members of the original team.

=== Later career (2018–present) ===
On January 29, 2018, Karyn discussed her partnerships with Taylor Swift and Reese Witherspoon in a podcast. After Vine shut down, Spencer became the Vice President of AT&T and Fullscreen's Hello Lab, a "social content venture". She criticized Adam Pally for his speech at the 10th Shorty Awards, in which he criticized the influencers who received the Shortys, comparing him to a school bully. In 2019, Spencer was named the first director of talent partnerships and influence marketing at Target, where she produced its web series Let's Target! featuring influencers such as Emma Chamberlain and launched its sponsorship campaign #TargetTalent. She left Target and joined Whalar, a marketing agency for social media influencers, in February 2020 and became its Senior Vice President of Partnerships, and later Chief Marketing Officer. After just two years of working for Whaler, Spencer left the company and moved to Costa Rica to start an unspecified venture.

Spencer has said that she believes Vine failed because top Viners could not make money from the app. In 2022, Spencer and other former Vine employees criticized Elon Musk's poll on whether to restore Vine, opining that users felt nostalgia for the app more than they ever liked Vine itself. She added that TikTok has researched previous competitors before it converted and that Musk had not displayed enough competence to revive Vine with TikTok as a competitor.

== Personal life ==
Spencer lived in Venice Beach, California. She moved to Costa Rica in August 2021. Born to Tom and Peggy Spencer of Wilmington, North Carolina, she married Eric Murphy in 2004 and was once credited as Karyn Spencer Murphy.
