= Michael Pavone =

American film director

Michael "Mike" Pavone is an American screenwriter, television producer/writer, former actor and former executive vice president of WWE Studios with WWE before his departure from the company in August 2011.

== Career ==
=== Film and television career ===
Pavone's first screen credit was for the teleplay of the 1990 episode "The Line" of the series Nasty Boys (TV series). In 1992, he was a writer for the television series Renegade. In 1993, he was a writer for the television series Against the Grain. He adapted a play for television in 1993 for Trouble Shooters: Trapped Beneath the Earth. In 1994, he was a writer for the unsold television pilot Golden Gate. Pavone directed and wrote the film Chameleon in 1995 and in that same year he was a writer for the television series Medicine Ball. He was also a writer for the television series The Monroes and The Client in 1995.

Pavone was co-creator, as well as occasional producer and writer, for the series High Incident (1996–97). In 2002 Pavone was a writer for the television series Street Time. In 2005 Michael Pavone became a writer for the Fox Network show Prison Break. He is credited for writing the episode "Cell Test" in Season 1 of the show.

Pavone occasionally worked as an actor between 1998 and 2019, appearing in 16 episodes of four different television, as well as credits for appearing in four short films. His most prolific work was 12 episodes – ranging from two to five appearances per season – over the four season run of Any Day Now (1998–2002).

Pavane has also worked as television director, directing episodes of Jack & Jill, Everwood and the aforementioned The Client series. As well as directing the films That's What I Am (2011), The Reunion (2011), which were both produced by WWE Studios.

=== WWE ===
It was reported in the August 4, 2008 edition of the Wrestling Observer Newsletter that Pavone was hired by WWE as a creative consultant to the writers of the company's shows Monday Night Raw on USA Network and Friday Night SmackDown on Syfy In June 2009, Pavone took over as executive VP of WWE Studios, replacing Michael Lake, who left the company to pursue other opportunities.

Los Angeles Times reported on August 12, 2011, Mike Pavone has left the company. There was no public reason given for his departure. Pavone's exit from WWE Studios came after the lackluster box office performance of the film That's What I Am.
