= Troom Troom =

Life hack and D.I.Y YouTube channel

- Logo used since 2015

YouTube information
- Channel: Troom Troom
- Years active: 2015–present
- Genres: Life hack; D.I.Y; prank
- Subscribers: 23.9 million
- Views: 10.5 billion
- Last updated: Jan 10, 2026

Troom Troom is a multinational YouTube channel often cited as being based in Ukraine. It is most known for its life hack, D.I.Y, and prank content. Their videos have received criticism from both news publications and YouTubers for their bizarre nature alongside their usage of clickbait titles, and are widely parodied, especially on YouTube. As of 2023, the channel has over 23 million subscribers and 9 billion views, putting it in the Top 200 most subscribed channels.

== History ==
Troom Troom's YouTube channel was created in 2015 in Odesa, Ukraine. It did not begin with its current style and is noted to have started as a tame attempt at D.I.Y tutorials. It is owned by Unicorn Media. Not much else is known about Troom Troom's origins or ownership, although it is monetized.

== Format and style ==
Troom Troom videos are known for having a distinct style. The videos are brightly coloured and include many sound effects. The videos have vibrant thumbnails as well. Another distinction is that most of the characters are not given real names, instead bearing monikers such as "Dolly" and "Redhead". Its genre of DIY content makes it comparable to channels such as 5-Minute Crafts.

== Reception ==
The Ukrainian flag version of the logo, in response to the Russian invasion of Ukraine, used on the main YouTube channel's icon and banner in 2022.

Troom Troom videos are widely reacted to and criticized by YouTubers such as Danny Gonzalez and Jarvis Johnson. The videos sometimes receive questioning for their narration, which is criticized for sounding unnatural. In addition, some consider the videos to be unsuitable for children, and to be encouraging dangerous behavior. Troom Troom videos are sometimes considered to be "content farms" for their vibrant thumbnails and "clickbait titles". Although Troom Troom's videos are popular with their target audience and often go viral, they are generally negatively received by others. The channel has over 23 million subscribers and over 10 billion views, making it one of the most popular on the platform.

In 2025, Treisi, a former actor for Troom Troom, spoke out about the YouTube channel. While initially hired for being of Afro-Ukrainian descent, she left after criticism towards establishing her own brand and ethnic discrimination. She has denied allegations of Troom Troom brainwashing their actors. She has also confirmed that English proficiency is not needed for acting at Troom Troom.
