= Peter Morgan (producer) =

American film producer

Peter Morgan is an American film producer. He was appointed the vice president of development of RKO Pictures in 2002 and the senior vice president of production for Sony Pictures' O.N.C. Entertainment in 2005.

Morgan has served as an executive producer for films including Identity Thief, Killers, and the Poison Ivy trilogy, and as a producer of Spread and American Sniper. He was nominated for an Academy Award in 2015 for American Sniper.

== Producing credits ==
- American Sniper (2014)
- Identity Thief (2013)
- Killers (2010)
- Spread (2009)
- Balls Out: Gary the Tennis Coach (2009)
- Poison Ivy: The New Seduction (1997)
- Poison Ivy II (1996)
- Sharon's Secret (1995)
- National Lampoon's Senior Trip (1995)
- Father and Scout (1994)
- Final Appeal (1993)
- Big Girls Don't Cry... They Get Even (1992)
- Poison Ivy (1992)
