= Pete Biagi =

American cinematographer (born 1963)

- Born: 1963 (age 62–63)
- Occupation: Cinematographer

Pete Biagi (born 1963) is a cinematographer. His work includes numerous short films and eighteen feature-length films. He has also shot local commercials and national commercials. He won Intercom's Best Cinematography Award, an AICP Award, and an Indy Award. He was featured in the first season of HBO's Project Greenlight while working as the cinematographer for the film Stolen Summer.

== Filmography ==
=== Films ===
Key
†	Denotes films that have not yet been released

Year	Title	Director	Notes
2018	Lives: Visible	Michelle Citron	
2018	Hope Springs Eternal	Jack C. Newell	

=== TV Series ===
Key
†	Denotes films that have not yet been released

Year	Title	Director	Notes
2017	Special Skills	David Pasquesi	
