= Hope Springs Eternal (film) =

- Film poster
- Directed by: Jack C. Newell
- Written by: Stephanie Mickus
- Starring: Mia Rose Frampton; Stony Blyden; Juliette Angelo; Pej Vahdat; Beth Lacke
- Cinematography: Peter Biagi
- Edited by: David Zimmerman
- Music by: Jay Vincent
- Production company: Gylden Entertainment
- Release date: August 10, 2018
- Running time: 78 minutes
- Country: United States
- Language: English

Hope Springs Eternal is a 2018 indie comedy film directed by Jack C. Newell from a screenplay written by Stephanie Mickus. The movie was filmed in Chicago, with scenes in the neighborhoods of River Forest and Arlington Heights. Production offices were set up in a house that would later be demolished in Deerfield, Illinois. The "mean girls" in the film are played by three members of the pop band Cimorelli: Amy, Dani, & Lisa. The film was released on iTunes.

== Plot ==
Hope Gracin is an 18-year-old girl who has had cancer since she was 12. Since then, she has taken advantage of the sympathy and special treatment she receives because of her illness. She has an Australian boyfriend, Kai, whom she met on a Make-A-Wish trip, who after hearing she had a limited time to live, comes back to the US to stay with her. She also has a best friend Sarah, who has cancer, and another best friend Seth, who is always trying to get her out of the pity attitude. Later, Hope finds out that her cancer is in remission, but chooses not to tell anyone yet to keep getting attention, although Sarah, Seth, and Hope's mother Dolores know. The popular girl at school, Zoe, feels sorry for Hope and befriends her. On the bleachers, she invites Hope for a mani-pedi, even though that's when Hope is supposed to study with Seth. When Seth leaves angrily, Hope accidentally says that her cancer is getting worse which leads Zoe to throw a party for her. As they leave, Zoe's other friends bully and break a new girl's phone. She starts getting extra sympathy, and Kai tells her that he loves her, before they kiss. One day, when Sarah visit's Hope, she finds out that Hope hasn't told anyone yet that she's in remission, and berates Hope that she was using cancer as a prop for popularity, attention, sympathy, and an easy life.

Angrily, Hope accidentally says that she doesn't care about Sarah, who leaves. Sarah then goes into surgery for a transplant. At a career festival at the school, Seth asks Hope to tell her friends the truth. Zoe and her friends leave, disgusted, and Kai breaks up with Hope, for lying. Hope blames Seth for what her friends and boyfriend did to her, and he also leaves her. Hope's popularity starts to rapidly decrease, and now her teachers stop giving her special treatment. One day, Hope randomly starts talking to someone in the girls bathroom before realizing that she is the new girl whose phone broke while being bullied a few days prior. Her name is Mildred "Millie". They become friends, and Hope starts studying in all her free time, to become a pediatric oncologist. Hope tries a few times to meet Sarah to apologize, but she isn't allowed to meet Sarah because she is in recovery from her transplant surgery. Meanwhile, Kai starts dating Zoe. Seth attends the party, which now is a cupcake party instead of Hope's party, and turns on the TV as per Hope's request. It is a video of Hope apologizing and explaining about why she lied. Seth, everyone at the party, Sarah, and Hope's mother are shown to be watching the video, which is shot by Millie. Then Seth leaves the party and Hope personally apologizes to him at the hospital. Then they both visit Sarah, and Hope also personally apologizes to her.

== Cast ==
- Mia Rose Frampton as Hope Gracin
- Beth Lacke as Dolores Gracin
- Stony Blyden as Seth Grass
- Juliette Angelo as Sarah Handleman
- Lauren Giraldo as Zoe Montoya
- Beau Brooks as Kai Walker
- Pej Vahdat as Mr. Garner
- Kate Rachesky as Mildred
- Tim Kazurinsky as Mr. Burda
- LaRoyce Hawkins as Mr. Baser
