= Chameleon (1995 film) =

- Directed by: Michael Pavone
- Written by: Michael Pavone; Dave Alan Johnson
- Produced by: Dave Alan Johnson; Michael Pavone
- Starring: Anthony LaPaglia
- Cinematography: Ross Berryman
- Edited by: Joanne D'Antonio
- Music by: John Debney
- Production company: Rysher Entertainment
- Release date: 1995
- Running time: 108 minutes
- Country: United States
- Language: English

Chameleon is a 1995 American crime thriller film starring Anthony LaPaglia. The film was directed by Michael Pavone. Pavone wrote and produced the film with Dave Alan Johnson.

== Plot ==
When agents of the Drug Enforcement Administration are ambushed during a raid, Agent Matt Gianni suspects a leak and asks his boss Stuart Langston to enlist an outside agent. Langston brings in Willie Serling, who is a master of disguises and whose family was killed by Alberto Cortese, a drug smuggler. Langston sends Serling to jail undercover to investigate a drug operation possibly run by Cortese.

While in jail, Serling disguises himself as a computer expert and recovers critical bank records. Gianni frees him from jail and sends him to a bank to pose an auditor and follow up on the records. Serling investigates bank executive Jill Hallmann but begins dating her. He finds out that another executive, Morris Steinfeld, is the one involved in criminal activity.

Steinfeld finds out that he is being investigated and reports to bank president Jason Ainsley, who informs Cortese of the investigation. Cortese kills Ainsley and also gets Steinfeld killed. Serling, who is targeted next, disguises himself as a hobo and is able to shoot Cortese first though he does not kill him.

Serling's behavior after the events becomes bizarre, and he ignores Gianni’s imploring to quit. Gianni arrests at the prison and the bank, and the perpetrators involved with the drug operation. Meanwhile, Serling transfers Cortese's money from an offshore account. He tells Hallmann his real identity and leaves her. When Cortese attempts to come after Hallmann, Serling shows up and kills Cortese.

== Cast ==
- Anthony LaPaglia as Willie Serling
- Kevin Pollak as Matt Gianni
- Wayne Knight as Stuart Langston
- Melora Hardin as Jill Hallmann
- Andy Romano as Giovanni Pazzatto
- Richard Brooks as Tom Wilson
- Derek McGrath as Morris Steinfeld

== Reception ==
The Roanoke Times reviewed the film, “The... plot is standard movie thriller stuff — a little slow and, at the end, cliched — but LaPaglia’s performance overcomes the flaws.”

TV Guide reported, “Chameleon has commendable ambitions to rise above the usual straight to video level, but is seriously undermined by sluggish pacing and gross overlength... (the film) is a surprisingly low key, talky thriller that remains consistently watchable, but doesn’t really explore its intriguing premise involving disguise, identity, and personality transference.” DVD & Video Guide 2005 said, “LaPaglia has a field day in the central role but the film’s plot is just a bit too derivative.”

Psychotherapists on Film noted how the film utilizes a psychiatrist as a character; Willie Serling’s boss asks a psychiatrist about Serling's response to his family being killed. The authors write, “She says Serling has an “as if” personality brought on by his trauma and if he is left in the field he could lose whatever personality he still has. She is right, but a new love saves him.”
