= That's What I Am =

- Theatrical release poster
- Directed by: Michael Pavone
- Written by: Michael Pavone
- Produced by: Michael Pavone
- Starring: Ed Harris; Chase Ellison; Amy Madigan
- Cinematography: Kenneth Zunder
- Edited by: Marc Pollon
- Music by: James Raymond
- Production company: WWE Studios
- Distributed by: Samuel Goldwyn Films
- Release date: April 29, 2011; (limited)
- Running time: 101 minutes
- Country: United States
- Language: English
- Box office: $6,400

That's What I Am is a 2011 American comedy-drama film directed by Michael Pavone and starring Ed Harris and Chase Ellison. It received a limited release on April 29, 2011, and was later released on DVD on July 15, 2011. It was filmed at Riverdale High School in Jefferson, LA.

== Plot ==
Set in one of the Jefferson Middle Schools of California in 1965, the film follows a story of schoolboy Andrew "Andy" Nichol who is paired up with the school's reject, Stanley "Big G" Minor for a project assigned by a teacher named Mr. Steven Simon. As the project goes on, Andy and Stanley form a close bond. While the project is going, a rumor starts spreading around the school that Mr. Simon is a homosexual. One of the school's bullies, Jason Freel, tells his father, who goes to the school principal to ask if the rumor is true. The principal does not know, so she confronts Mr. Simon, who says that being a homosexual should not change his job. Mr. Simon does not confirm nor deny that he is a homosexual. Jason Freel's father threatens to tell the whole community about the rumor, which he takes as a fact.

While that is happening, Andy's crush, Mary Clear, falls in love with him. Ricky Brown, the school's bully who is Mary's ex-boyfriend, threatens Andy that if he goes near Mary, he'll kill him because he still likes Mary. Ignoring this fact, Andy asks Mary if she wants to go steady, and she says yes. While trying to ask Mary, Ricky shows up to the scene and tries to beat Andy up, but before he gets to it Mary steps in and tells Ricky to leave Andy alone. Stanley is also revealed to have wanted to perform in the school talent show, and even though Stanley's best friend Norman Gunmeyer does not condone it, Stanley participates anyway. At the show, Andy realizes that Norman isn't there, and bikes over to his house to ask him to go. Norman puts up a fight but then decides to go. When Stanley starts to perform, Ricky has a tomato in his hand and is planning on throwing the tomato at Stanley. Andy walks up to him and tells him not to throw the tomato. Andy then kicks him in the groin, and Ricky screams in anguish, yet Mr. Simon does not punish Andy but rather congratulates him. Andy also finds out that Mr. Simon is moving to Florida, and even though Andy tries to stop him, Mr. Simon's mind is set. Andy and his English class who have been taught by Mr. Simon surprise him by putting flowers in his car. In the end, it shows the "yearbook" of the school, and what happens to the characters.

== Cast ==
- Ed Harris as Mr. Simon
- Molly Parker as Mrs. Nichol
- Amy Madigan as Principal Kelner
- Chase Ellison as Andy Nichol
- Randy Orton as Ed Freel
- Daniel Roebuck as Mr. Nichol
- Mia Rose Frampton as Mary Clear
- Cameron Deane Stewart as Carl Freel
- Daniel Yelsky as Norman Gunmeyer
- Alexander Walters as Stanley "Big G" Minor
- Camille E. Bourgeois III as Jason Freel
- Jordan Reynolds as Ricky Brown
- Brett Lapeyrouse as Bruce Modak
- Greg Kinnear as Narrator (uncredited)

== Reception ==
In its limited theatrical release of 10 theaters, the film grossed about $6,400 for three days. On the review aggregator website Rotten Tomatoes, 55% of 20 critics' reviews are positive. Metacritic, which uses a weighted average, assigned the film a score of 53 out of 100, based on 11 critics, indicating "mixed or average" reviews.

Alison Willmore of The A.V. Club gave the film a score of D+ praising its way of combining To Kill A Mockingbird with The Sandlot but failing to bring a climax.

On The Hollywood Reporter, David Rooney wrote: "The film has a crisp, clean look, with decent period production values. But its chief distinction is Harris’ empathetic work in an uncharacteristically subdued role, striking stirring notes especially in some strong scenes with his real-life wife Madigan."

Film School Rejects gave a film a D− praising the teen fun and realistic relationships but criticizing painful acting and loose end script. Film Journal International took issue with the film and accused the director of presenting a female character in a film as a slut. The New York Times compared it to a mix of Hallmark movie and The Wonder Years.
