= Spread (film) =

2009 film by David Mackenzie

- Theatrical release poster
- Directed by: David Mackenzie
- Screenplay by: Jason Hall
- Story by: Jason Hall; Paul Kolsby
- Produced by: Jason Goldberg; Ashton Kutcher; Peter Morgan
- Starring: Ashton Kutcher; Anne Heche; Margarita Levieva; Sebastian Stan
- Cinematography: Steven Poster
- Edited by: Nicholas Erasmus
- Music by: John Swihart
- Production company: Katalyst Films
- Distributed by: Anchor Bay Films
- Release dates: January 17, 2009 (Sundance); August 14, 2009 (United States)
- Running time: 98 minutes
- Country: United States
- Language: English
- Box office: $12 million

Spread is a 2009 American sex comedy film directed by David Mackenzie and starring Ashton Kutcher and Anne Heche. The film premiered at the Sundance Film Festival on January 17, 2009, and was released theatrically in the United States by Anchor Bay Films on August 14, 2009.

== Plot ==
Narcissistic gigolo Nikki lives in Los Angeles, drifting from one relationship to another without a steady job or place to live. He preys on women who can provide for him. After meeting Samantha at a club he moves in with her, using his looks and sexual prowess to keep her happy.

Before long, however, Nikki starts cheating on Samantha, first with his friend Emily, then with Christina, whom he met at another party. Emily disapproves of Nikki's free-wheeling lifestyle and has expressed a desire for a relationship, but Nikki has no real interest in her except for her wealth. Samantha catches Nikki with Christina, but they come to an uneasy arrangement where she will ignore his infidelity.

While Samantha is out of town, Nikki meets a waitress named Heather. He enlists his friend Harry to help him get Heather interested, but she does not fall for his charms. Although he eventually gets a date with her, she abandons him midway through the date.

Soon after, Heather unexpectedly shows up in Samantha's pool and they end up having sex. The next morning Nikki is moving Heather's car and realizes it does not belong to her but to her "boyfriend", after she told him she was single. Nikki throws her out in anger. However, he cannot stop thinking about her, and his obsession frustrates Samantha to the point that she gets fed up and throws him out, quickly taking him back. Nikki, however, leaves on his own accord, still enchanted by Heather.

Nikki searches for a place to stay, but has a falling out with Harry, is rejected by Emily, and cannot get into the parties he once did. He runs into Heather at a swanky hotel, and she admits that she was only interested in him as she believed he was rich. It transpires that she is the same as Nikki, scamming rich guys for money in the same way he does with girls. She lets him move in with her and her stoner roommate Eva and they begin dating, though Heather continues to scam and hustle, with some reluctant assistance from Nikki.

One day, an upset Heather reveals to Nikki that she just broke up with her fiancé because she is in love with Nikki. She further tells him her fiancé's family owns the New York Rangers and that he is who has been paying her bills and living expenses. Nikki, who has also fallen in love with her, is nonetheless angry that she kept her engagement from him, and leaves in a huff. When he returns he only finds a note that says she has left for New York City. At Eva's urging and with Harry paying for the airfare, Nikki follows her.

He finds her at a plush penthouse and begs her to come back to LA with him. She refuses, telling him she cannot afford to let him chase his fantasies while she gets the funds they would need to live. He then proposes to her, but she tells him that she is already married, breaking his heart. Heather says that she cannot get a divorce because she needs a marriage with stability and financial security. Her husband returns home and Heather passes Nikki off as a grocery boy, dismissing him.

Nikki returns to LA, finally seeing that life is worth the struggle, getting an honest job delivering groceries and living with Harry. He delivers groceries to Samantha's house, where they are picked up by the kept man who has replaced Nikki. The ending credits show Nikki feeding a dead mouse to Harry's African bullfrog with the frog gradually swallowing the protruding tail behind the ending credits.

== Cast ==
The cast list is in alphabetical order by actor last name.

- Maria Conchita Alonso as Ingrid
- Eric Balfour as Sean
- Rachel Blanchard as Emily
- Hart Bochner as Will
- Shane Brolly as Prince Stelio
- Reeve Carney as Band Leader
- Anne Heche as Samantha "Sam"
- Ashley Johnson as Eva
- Ashton Kutcher as Nikki
- Margarita Levieva as Heather
- Sonia Rockwell as Christina
- Sebastian Stan as Harry

== Production ==
The film was directed by David Mackenzie, and was produced by Jason Goldberg, Ashton Kutcher, Peter Morgan, and Karyn Spencer (assistant producer).

Anne Heche revealed David Mackenzie would often keep the camera distant so as not to interfere with 'the intimacy of a moment.' "There's one thing that's all one take, from when I walk in and find him [in a sexual act with] another girl, and her leaving, and Nikki and I get into a huge argument, all the way to when I throw him down on the couch and we start having sex. That's all one shot. You're never being told who to feel for or how to feel about it. The camera was literally out the window for that entire thing," Heche said.

== Reception ==
=== Critical reception ===
Spread was not well received by critics. According to critic aggregation site Rotten Tomatoes, the film scored a rating of 22% based on 59 reviews with the critical consensus; "Despite occasional detours into surprisingly dark territory, Spread overall is an ineffectual celebration of vacuous Los Angeles high life rather than a deconstruction of it." Metacritic, which uses a weighted average, assigned the film a score of 43 out of 100, based on 13 critics, indicating "mixed or average" reviews.

=== Box office ===
The film was released on August 14, 2009. At the box office, the film grossed $12,032,983, of which $250,618 was from North America.
