= Street Time =

- Genre: Drama
- Created by: Richard Stratton
- Starring: Rob Morrow; Michelle Nolden; Alexander Conti; Scott Cohen; Erika Alexander; Christopher Bolton
- Countries of origin: United States; Canada
- Original language: English
- No. of seasons: 2
- No. of episodes: 33

Production
- Executive producers: Richard Stratton; Stephen Kronish; Michael Pavone
- Producers: Tim Metcalfe; Frank Pugliese
- Running time: 60 minutes
- Production companies: Cliffwood Productions (season 1); Sony Pictures Television (Note: Credited as Columbia TriStar Domestic Television (2002).); Showtime Networks

Original release
- Network: Showtime
- Release: June 23, 2002 – October 29, 2003

Street Time is a drama television series created by Richard Stratton. The series stars Rob Morrow, Michelle Nolden, Alexander Conti, Scott Cohen, Erika Alexander and Christopher Bolton. The series aired on Showtime for two seasons from June 23, 2002, to October 29, 2003.

== Cast ==
- Rob Morrow as Kevin Hunter
- Michelle Nolden as Rachel Goldstein
- Alexander Conti as Timmy Liberti
- Scott Cohen as James Liberti
- Erika Alexander as Dee Mulhern
- Christopher Bolton as Peter Hunter
- Kate Greenhouse as Karen Liberti
- Allegra Fulton as Ann Valentine
- Simon Reynolds as Steve Goldstein
- Jack Knight as Sean Hunter
- Terrence Howard as Lucius Mosley
- Jeffrey James as James Liberti Jr.
- Rod Wilson as Joe Ennis
- Jeff Pustil as Gene
- Kathryn Zenna as Pia
- Robert Smith as Ron Skouras
- Gail Maurice as Skye Nighthawk
- Craig Eldridge as Chase MacPherson
- Richard Chevolleau as Adonis
- Don Francks as Mr. Goldstein
- Shant Srabian as Saad
- Juan Carlos Velis as Gusano Guzman
- Patricia Gage as Mary Hunter
- Polly Shannon as Danielle
- Red Buttons as Sam Kahan
- Keith Carradine as Frank Dugan
- Billy Dee Williams as Charles White
- Saul Williams as Greg Cooper
- Rick Fox as Peter Samson
- Giancarlo Esposito as Jesse Haslim
- Judd Hirsch as Shimi Goldman
- Daniel Dae Kim as Vo Nguyen
- Serena Williams as Meeka Hayes

== Series overview ==
Season	Episodes	Originally released	
Season	Episodes	First released	Last released
1	20	June 23, 2002	June 11, 2003
2	13	August 6, 2003	October 29, 2003

== Episodes ==
=== Season 1 (2002–03) ===
No. overall	No. in season	Title	Directed by	Written by	Original release date	Prod. code
1	1	"Pilot: Part 1"	Marc Levin	Story by : Richard Stratton; Teleplay by : Richard Stratton & Stephen Kronish	June 23, 2002	100A
2	2	"Pilot: Part 2"	Marc Levin	Story by : Richard Stratton; Teleplay by : Richard Stratton & Stephen Kronish	June 23, 2002	100B
3	3	"Random Act"	Marc Levin	Stephen Kronish	June 30, 2002	101
4	4	"Above Suspicion"	Jon Cassar	Bruce Zimmerman	July 7, 2002	102
5	5	"Respect"	Marc Levin	Clifton Campbell	July 14, 2002	103
6	6	"Lesser Evils"	Ken Girotti	Lois Johnson	July 21, 2002	104
7	7	"The Truth Hurts... Bad"	Jon Cassar	Story by : Aaron Held; Teleplay by : Aaron Held & Stephen Kronish	July 28, 2002	105
8	8	"Good Deeds"	Allan Kroeker	Bruce Zimmerman & Lois Johnson	August 4, 2002	106
9	9	"Instant Karma"	Marc Levin	Clifton Campbell	August 11, 2002	107
10	10	"Rabid Dawg"	Milan Cheylov	Alfonse Ruggiero	August 18, 2002	108
11	11	"No Excuses"	Marc Levin	Lois Johnson & Bruce Zimmerman	August 25, 2002	109
12	12	"Betrayal"	Alex Chapple	Clifton Campbell, Lois Johnson & Bruce Zimmerman	September 1, 2002	110
13	13	"Reversal of Fortune"	Marc Levin	Clifton Campbell, Lois Johnson & Bruce Zimmerman	September 8, 2002	111
14	14	"Sex, Lies and a Truckload of Dates"	George Mendeluk	Lois Johnson	April 30, 2003	112
15	15	"Follow the Money"	Rob Morrow	Bruce Zimmerman	May 7, 2003	113
16	16	"Anger Management"	Nicholas J. Gray	Michael Pavone	May 13, 2003	114
17	17	"Right to Life"	Allan Kroeker	Roger Garrett	May 21, 2003	115
18	18	"Even"	Marc Levin	Lois Johnson	May 28, 2003	116
19	19	"On Goldie Pond"	George Mendeluk	Bruce Zimmerman	June 4, 2003	117
20	20	"Going Home"	Marc Levin	Richard Stratton	June 11, 2003	118

=== Season 2 (2003) ===
No. overall	No. in season	Title	Directed by	Written by	Original release date	Prod. code
21	1	"20 Hits"	Marc Levin	Paul Eckstein	August 6, 2003	201
22	2	"Watching the Watchers"	Alex Chapple	Paul Eckstein	August 13, 2003	202
23	3	"Lockdown"	Rob Morrow	Paul Eckstein	August 20, 2003	203
24	4	"High Holly Roller"	Alex Chapple	Paul Eckstein	August 27, 2003	204
25	5	"Cop Killer"	Marc Levin	Paul Eckstein & Jack LoGiudice	September 3, 2003	205
26	6	"Born to Kill"	George Mendeluk	Paul Eckstein & John Moccia	September 10, 2003	206
27	7	"Pack of Rats"	Nicholas J. Gray	Paul Eckstein & Anastasia Traina	September 17, 2003	207
28	8	"Gone"	George Mendeluk	Paul Eckstein & Tony Puryear	September 24, 2003	208
29	9	"Get Up, Stand Up"	Jeff Pustil	Paul Eckstein	October 1, 2003	209
30	10	"Hostage"	Rob Morrow	Paul Eckstein	October 8, 2003	210
31	11	"Brothers"	Jonathan Tammuz	Paul Eckstein	October 15, 2003	211
32	12	"Fly Girl"	Unknown	Paul Eckstein & Jack LoGiudice	October 22, 2003	212
33	13	"The Whole Truth"	Unknown	Paul Eckstein	October 29, 2003	213
