= Alexander Conti =

Canadian actor

- Born: Alexander Biagio Conti; 1 September 1993 (age 31); Brantford, Ontario, Canada
- Occupation: Actor
- Years active: 2000–present

Alexander Biagio Conti (born 1 September 1993) is a Canadian actor. He made his acting debut in the film Finding Forrester (2000). Since then, he has been nominated for five Young Artist Awards.

== Biography ==
Conti was born in Brantford, Ontario, of Italian and Brazilian heritage. He is the youngest of four children. His older brothers, Adam Conti and Jordan Conti, are also actors. His sister Brittany also aspires to be an actress. He has expressed his love of performing and has characterized continuing to act as his "greatest desire". He has acted in commercials, radio, animation voice overs, and television series. His first real acting experience was in the Showtime Networks series, Street Time, on which he was a regular. He has also worked with Director Andy Wolk, alongside Peter Falk.

== Film credits ==
Conti's film work includes roles in The Pacifier, Cheaper by the Dozen 2, and Case 39 (as Diego Ramirez).

He has roles in movies like: Gooby, The Good Witch 2 and the Disney Channel Original Movie, Harriet the Spy: Blog Wars as Sport.

== Television credits ==
Feature films
Year	Film	Role	Notes
2000	Finding Forrester	Little boy	Uncredited
2005	The Pacifier	Little boy	
2005	Cheaper by the Dozen 2	Kenneth Murtaugh	
2007	KAW	Tyler Whitmore	
2009	Gooby	Eric	
2009	Case 39	Diego	Nominated—Young Artist Award for Best Performance in a Feature Film (Supporting Young Actor)
2010	Dog Pound	Sal	
Films made for television
Year	Title	Role	Notes
2004	Celeste in the City	Young Dana	Scenes deleted
2004	When Angels Come to Town	Jimmy Reid	
2008	Snow 2: Brain Freeze	Ryan	
2009	The Good Witch's Garden	Duke	
2010	Harriet the Spy: Blog Wars	Sport	Nominated—Young Artist Award for Best Performance in a TV Movie, Miniseries or Special (Supporting Young Actor)
Television
Year	Title	Role	Notes
2001	Braceface	Dylan	
2003	Missing	Tommy Wilhite	1 episode
2002–2003	Street Time	Timmy Liberti	21 episodes
2004	Peep and the Big Wide World	Bunny #3	
2004	The Grid	Eddie McCann	1 episode
2005	Kojak	Carlito	1 episode
2006	Skyland	Cobbs	1 episode
2009	Overruled!	Shecky Sheckerson	1 episode
2007–2008	Di-Gata Defenders	Rion	26 episodes
2011-2013	Life with Boys	Travis	3 episodes
2015	Hemlock Grove	Kessell	1 episode

== Awards and nominations ==
Year	Award	Category	Work	Result
2005	Young Artist Award	Best Performance in a TV Movie, Miniseries or Special (Supporting Young Actor)	When Angels Come to Town	Nominated
2009	Young Artist Award	Best Performance in a Voice-Over Role (Supporting Young Actor)	Di-Gata Defenders	Nominated
2009	Young Artist Award	Best Performance in a TV Movie, Miniseries or Special (Supporting Young Actor)	Snow 2: Brain Freeze	Nominated
2011	Young Artist Award	Best Performance in a Feature Film (Supporting Young Actor)	Harriet the Spy: Blog Wars	Nominated
2011	Young Artist Award	Best Performance in a Feature Film - Supporting Young Actor	Case 39	Nominated
