= Danny Gonzalez =

American commentary YouTuber (born 1994)

- Gonzalez in 2026
- Born: Daniel James Gonzalez; June 12, 1994 (age 32); Chicago, Illinois, U.S.
- Education: Wheaton North High School; Georgia Institute of Technology (BS)
- Occupations: YouTuber; comedian; musician
- Spouse: Laura Fuechsl (m. 2017)
- Children: 2

Twitch information
- Channel: DannyGoonzalez
- Followers: 415,000

YouTube information
- Channel: Danny Gonzalez
- Years active: 2014–present
- Genres: Commentary; comedy; gaming
- Subscribers: 7.28 million (main channel); 10.27 million (combined) (Note: Subscribers, broken down by channel: 7.28 million (Danny Gonzalez); 2.64 million (2 Danny 2 Furious); 460 thousand (Danny GAMEzalez); 29.1 thousand (LazyNeighbors); 9.32 thousand (TheLazyNeighbors); 3.73 thousand (hylitezone))
- Views: 2.05 billion (main channel); 2.26 billion (combined) (Note: Views, broken down by channel: 2.05 billion (Danny Gonzalez); 316.43 million (2 Danny 2 Furious); 44.12 million (Danny GAMEzalez); 3.20 million (LazyNeighbors); 182 thousand (TheLazyNeighbors); 74 thousand (hylitezone))
- Danny Gonzalez's voice Gonzalez discussing his old YouTube videos Recorded September 2020
- Last updated: 23 October, 2026

Daniel James Gonzalez (born June 12, 1994) is an American commentary YouTuber, comedian, musician and former Viner who originally came to prominence for his short comedy sketches on Vine in 2014. He created his main YouTube channel that same year, subsequently moving over to YouTube full-time when Vine closed down in 2017. His three personal channels and three group channels have collectively earned around 10.42 million subscribers, and 2.4 billion views, as of October 2026.

== Early life and education ==
Daniel James Gonzalez was born on June 12, 1994, in Chicago, Illinois, and grew up in the city of Wheaton. He lived in England for two years when he was around 8 or 9. He has an older brother, Matt (born 1992), and a younger sister. His brother is a server at a restaurant in Austin, Texas. Gonzalez attended Wheaton North High School. As a child in the mid-2000s, he and his friends uploaded short comedy sketches to YouTube, but they broke off when he went to college.

Gonzalez graduated from the Georgia Institute of Technology with a Bachelor of Science degree in computational media in 2016.

== Career ==
=== Vine (2013–2017) ===
In Gonzalez's sophomore year of college, a friend showed him Vine, an app where users could only upload six-second short videos ("Vines"). While initially uninterested, Gonzalez was convinced to start making Vines in late 2013 because of comedian Bo Burnham posting on the app.

His early videos attempted to imitate Burnham's and were based around small quips. In early 2014, he tried to distinguish his Vines by using special effects, which few Viners were doing at the time, including the use of green screens to insert himself into music videos. Thanks to this strategy, Gonzalez's Vines began to grow in popularity. His most viral Vine was one where he edited shoes onto the dinosaurs in Jurassic Park (1993) scenes while a digital voice sang "What are those?" to the theme music.

Gonzalez appeared in the Vine-produced web series Camp Unplug (2016), where he first met fellow Viner Drew Gooden. As Vine was a newer platform compared to other social media sites, most Viners knew each other—what Gonzalez described as a "tight-knit" atmosphere. When owner Twitter, Inc. announced it was shutting down Vine in 2016, he had graduated from college and moved to Illinois to join a group of other successful Viners. He became apprehensive with this news.

Gonzalez had 2.9 million followers on Vine by the time it closed in January 2017. With large audiences but no platform, he and many other former Viners moved to YouTube. He told The New York Times that he decided on YouTube because it was a well-known website and also expressed interest in making videos on Twitter and TikTok.

=== YouTube (2017–present) ===
From 2017 to 2018, Gonzalez wrote, edited, and starred in various shorts and "Corridor Crew" videos for Corridor Digital.

Drew Gooden also started a commentary channel on YouTube and the two began traveling to appear in each other's videos, becoming close friends. A running joke between their fans is that they pretend to confuse the two YouTubers together because of their various similarities. This inspired their We Are Two Different People Tour in 2019, with YouTuber Kurtis Conner as a guest star. The tour, with music, effects, and theatrical elements interspersed with sketches and comedy routines, was their first major live performance and ran from September to October. The two also released a parody song called "We Are Not the Same Person" to promote the tour.

== YouTube style ==
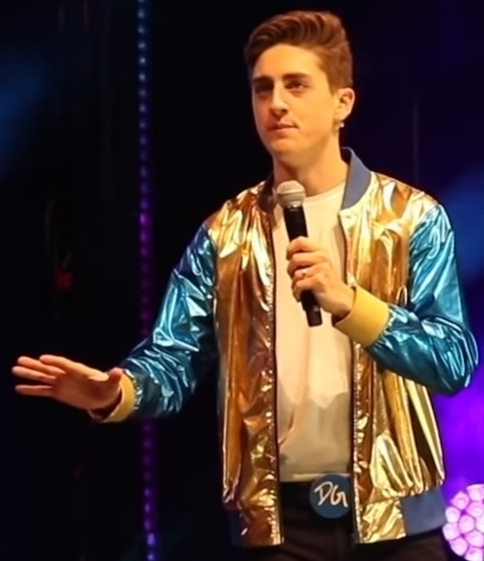
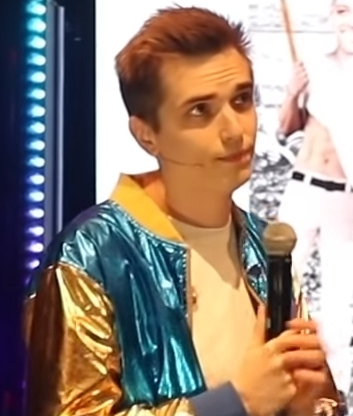
Gonzalez (left) and Drew Gooden (right) on their "We Are Two Different People" tour in 2019

Gonzalez's videos are often commentary on different aspects of Internet culture, criticism of YouTube, B movies, and general cultural criticism. His 2018 Troom Troom reaction videos popularized the channel. He is known for his criticisms of Jake and Logan Paul, and for his commentaries on Musical.ly (later TikTok) stars. In addition to commentary videos, he is also known for his parody music. He refers to his fanbase by the singular name "Greg".

Gonzalez is associated with fellow YouTubers Drew Gooden, Cody Ko and Noel Miller.

== Personal life ==
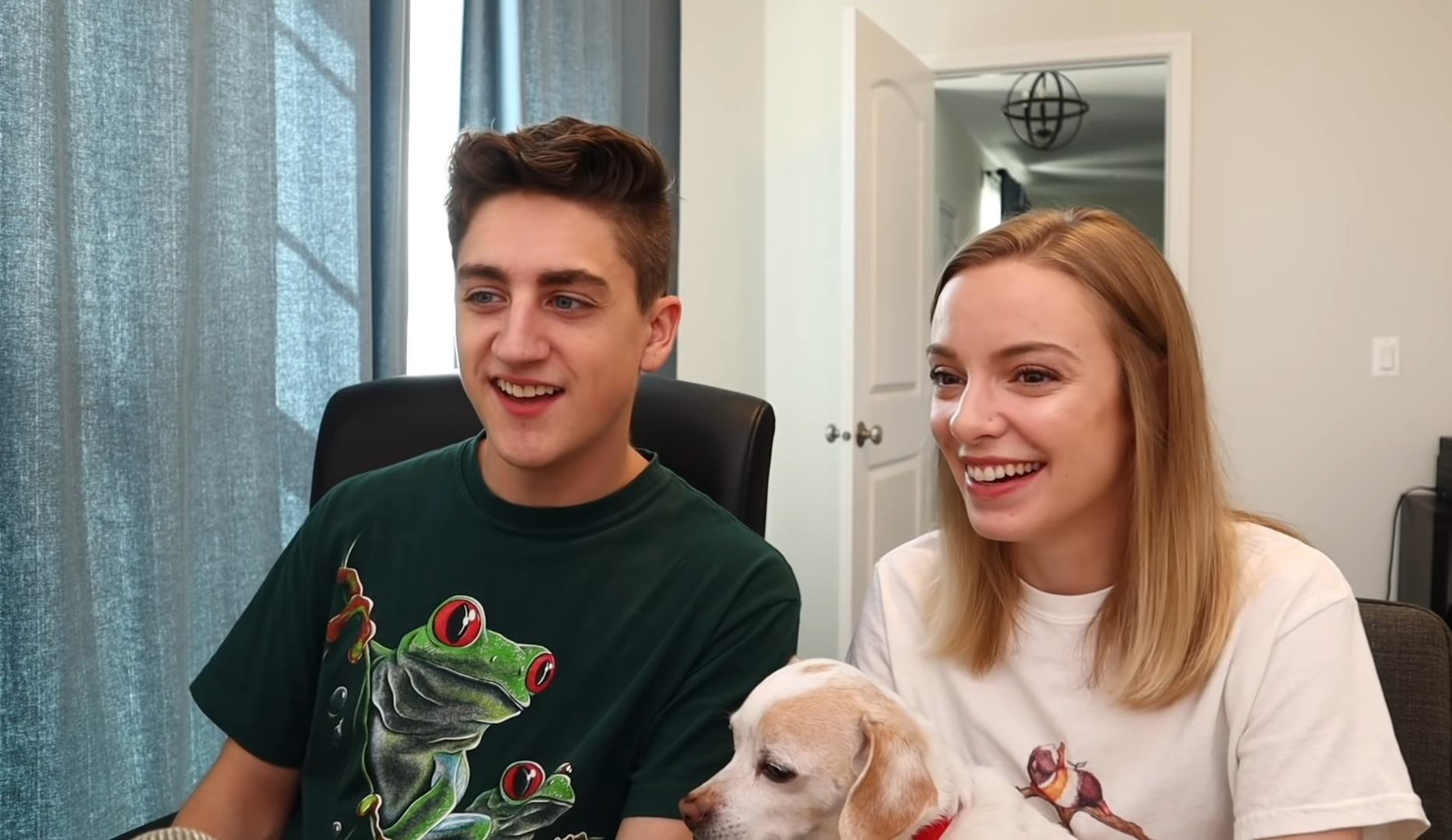
Gonzalez and his wife, Laura Fuechsl, in April 2020

He married Laura Fuechsl (/fjuːˈʃɛl/ few-SHEL) on July 1, 2017.

On May 19, 2023, Gonzalez announced that he and Fuechsl were expecting their first child in October. Their son was born in September 2023. Their second son was born in 2025, the birth being announced in a video.

In 2024, Gonzalez openly mentioned his support of Palestine and his support for those who speak out against its ethnic cleansing.

== Awards and nominations ==
Year	Award	Category	Result	Ref.
2018	10th Shorty Awards	YouTube Comedian	Nominated	
2019	9th Streamy Awards	Breakout Creator	Nominated	
2020	10th Streamy Awards	Commentary	Nominated	
2021	11th Streamy Awards	Commentary	Nominated	
2022	12th Streamy Awards	Commentary	Won	

== Discography ==
=== EPs ===
Title	Album details	Peak chart positions
Title	Album details	Comedy Albums
Bump This	Released: May 11, 2019; Label: Self-released	2

=== Singles ===
Title	Year
"Vape Tricks" (featuring Aaron Chewning)	2016
"Beef with Me"	2017
"Spooky Boy"	2017
"Dab on the Haters (Young Face)"	2018
"Greg (Young Face)"	2018
"Hop Out the Whip (Young Face)"	2018
"Spooky Guy"	2018
"Johnny Johnny"	2018
"I'm Gonna Kill Santa Claus"	2018
"Slime"	2019
"This Video Is Over Now"	2019
"We Are Not the Same Person" (featuring Drew Gooden)	2019
"Help Let Me Go"	2019
"Spooky Ho"	2019
"Daddy"	2019
"La Croix"	2019
"Sad and Deep"	2019
"Yummy"	2020
"My Dad Is Rich"	2020
"Spooky Man"	2020
"Circus" (as Fox Szn)	2020
"In Love with a Creeper" (featuring Kurtis Conner)	2021
"I Ghosted Kevin Jonas"	2022
"Nepo Baby" (as Fox Szn)	2024
"Last Night" (as Fox Szn, featuring Kurtis Conner as 3Drinkz)	2024
