= Lauren Giraldo =

American actress and social media personality

- Born: January 11, 1998 (age 28); Miami, Florida, U.S.

YouTube information
- Channel: Lauren Giraldo
- Years active: 2013–present
- Genres: Vlogging; fashion; lifestyle
- Subscribers: 1.14 million
- Views: 134.18 million
- Last updated: January 7, 2026

Lauren Giraldo (born January 11, 1998) is an American social media influencer. With over one million subscribers on her YouTube channel, Giraldo also has followings on Instagram, Snapchat, Twitter and TikTok. She has been nominated for two Shorty Awards, a Streamy Award and a Premios Juventud.

Growing up in Miami, Florida, Giraldo started social media on Vine in 2013 as Princess Lauren, aged fifteen. By early 2016, she had amassed 3.3 million followers and moved to Los Angeles. She has hosted and produced several shows and played roles in web series and Hope Springs Eternal (2018). On January 27, 2017, she released her debut single "Only Lovers" and went on tour the same year to promote her debut extended play. In November 2020, Giraldo's treadmill workout "12-3-30" and its hashtag #12330workout gained traction on TikTok.

== Early life ==
Lauren Giraldo was born on January 11, 1998, and grew up in Miami, Florida. As a child, Giraldo enjoyed entertaining and studied musical theater as a child. She described her parents as "strict but [also] supportive" as they did not allow her to use social media or go out with friends often. After enrolling in a new school, she registered a Facebook account under an alias and later had an Instagram account which she kept secret from relatives, which she used to talk to friends. Giraldo was an honors student and her favorite class was drama; in high school, she had two and a half hours of drama class daily.

== Career ==
=== 2013–2016: Vine ===
In 2013, Giraldo was introduced to Vine, an app for six-second videos, by a friend from drama class. She began posting Vines (videos on Vine) as Princess Lauren aged fifteen, six months after it first launched. She used the name so her mother would not be able to find her online. At first, she created Vines for her friends. Her following spiked after re-vine, a resharing feature, was introduced: after she returned from a cruise before re-vines, her following had increased from three thousand to thirty thousand. Her parents found out about her online presence after she reached one million followers, but were supportive. She had 2.4 million followers in March 2016.

Teen Vogue described her videos as "hilarious" and a "mix of random observations". They typically featured her saying or doing something ridiculous. Due to her young audience, she preferred to keep her videos wholesome. Giraldo did not spend much time planning or creating her Vines, which were often posted after one take. She posted around three times a week and accepted between one and thirty brand deals a month. She earned thousands of dollars from sponsored Vines, but was reluctant to disclose the exact amount. Giraldo was also invited to attend the Grammies and the MTV Video Music Awards. An article written by her addressed to Essena O'Neill appeared in Cosmopolitan in 2015.

After attending her first VidCon, Giraldo met YouTubers and was inspired to start a YouTube channel. Due to her busy schedule, she had to attend school online. Giraldo moved to Los Angeles in early 2016 to pursue an entertainment career, aged seventeen. Around that time, she had amassed over 3.3 million followers. In June 2016, she starred in Camp Unplug, a series of thirty-six Vines, alongside thirteen other Viners and was nominated Best Actress at the 6th Streamy Awards for her performance. She was also nominated at the 2016 Premios Juventud for her Vines in July. After Vine shut down in January 2017, many Viners migrated to other platforms, including YouTube.

=== 2016–2017: Web and streaming series, music and tour ===
During 2016, Giraldo attended or participated in the American Music Awards, Billboard Music Awards and Univision’s Premios Lo Nuestros Awards. She was the host of Lauren Against the Internet, a clip show produced by AwesomenessTV and released on Go90. In April 2016, Variety reported that Giraldo had closed a deal with Covert Media to produce a docuseries about Latino culture in Miami. Giraldo's fanbase was encouraged to audition.

In 2017, Lady Bits with Lauren Giraldo premiered on Fullscreen's subscription service. Hosted by Giraldo, the series is twelve episodes long and focused on current issues surrounding young women, such as feminism, slut-shaming in the music industry and being a role model on the internet. Giraldo described Lady Bits as a "passion project"; she and Whitnee Null serve as executive producers. Giraldo was a finalist for Snapchatter of the Year at the 9th Shorty Awards. Known under the username @Lglaurennnn on Snapchat, her nomination noted her efforts to bring attention to women's rights and gender equality on social media.

In 2016, Giraldo announced an upcoming debut extended play in mid-2017, which she was going on tour to promote. Her single "Only Lovers" was released on January 27, 2017. The Lauren Giraldo Tour began in San Francisco on February 15 and ended in New York City on March 7. A follow-up single titled "So Cool" was released on December 1, 2017.

=== 2017–present: "12-3-30" and promotions ===
In 2017, Giraldo began to focus more on her physical health but found beginning to exercise daunting. Experimenting with treadmill settings, she began walking on a 12 percent incline at 3 mph (4.8 km/h) for thirty minutes. Giraldo promoted the workout, which she called "12-3-30" and does five times a week, on her various social media. After her TikTok about "12-3-30" in November 2020 went viral, other influencers began to try the workout on social media and its hashtag #12330workout has since gained 131 million views on TikTok.

Giraldo appeared in the film Hope Springs Eternal (2018). In 2020, she curated a jewelry collection in a collaboration with Rocksbox, a subscription service where subscribers are given three pieces of jewelry a month for $21. Giraldo was also the face of Glowstunner, a beauty product by Morphe Cosmetics which launched on July 8, 2021.

== Personal life ==
Giraldo lives in Miami. A Latina, she is of Colombian and Cuban descent. She was in a relationship with Henrique Lago from 2018 to 2026. The couple married on May 20, 2023, in Colombia. Their first child was born in September 2023. In May 2026, Giraldo announced she is now single.

== Filmography ==
Television and film
Year	Title	Role	Notes
2016	FML	Afra	Film
2016	Beauty School	Bianca	Television film
2017	Campus Law	Keeley	1 episode
2018	Baby Doll Records	Kiba	6 episodes
2018	Hope Springs Eternal	Zoe	Film
2018	Starter Pack	Lily Lee	4 episodes
2019	Zoe Valentine	Kiba	6 episodes

== Awards and nominations ==
Year	Award	Category	Work	Result	Ref.
2016	Streamy Awards	Best Actress	Camp Unplug	Nominated	
2016	Premios Juventud	6 Segundo de Fama	Vine	Nominated	
2017	Shorty Awards	Snapchatter of the Year	Snapchat	Finalist	
2019	Shorty Awards	YouTuber of the Year	YouTube	Nominated	
