= Wandawega Lake Resort =

Resort in Wisconsin, United States of America

Coordinates: 42.743°N 88.567°W

Wandawega Lake and Wandawega Lake Resort, also known as Camp Wandawega, are located in Elkhorn, Wisconsin. The historic Camp Wandawega (formerly Wandawega Inn, Wandawega Hotel, and Wandawega Lake Resort) is listed on the National Register of Historic Places and the Wisconsin Register of Historic Places. The camp buildings dates to the 1920s when the modest resort was built and operated as a brothel and speakeasy. After many run-ins with the law, the madam, Annie Peck, was finally convicted of running "a bawdy house of ill fame", and sent to the women's prison in Taycheedah, WI in 1942. Her husband Gordon Peck was also convicted and served time. The resort was reopened circa 1950 as the Wandawega Lake Resort. The property was purchased by a Latvian order of Catholic priests in 1961. The Latvian Marian Fathers used the property as a Latvian Catholic cultural retreat center, including an informal kid's camp in the 1970s. The current owners, David Hernandez and Tereasa Surratt, advertising executives from Chicago, have been restoring the property since 2004. Hernandez attended the camp as a child, as he is half-Latvian and his family were regulars there from the 1960s to the 1980s. The camp is on 25 acres and includes a 3-story hotel, lodge, cottages, and historic memorabilia.
