= Kurtis Conner =

Canadian stand-up comedian and YouTuber (born 1994)

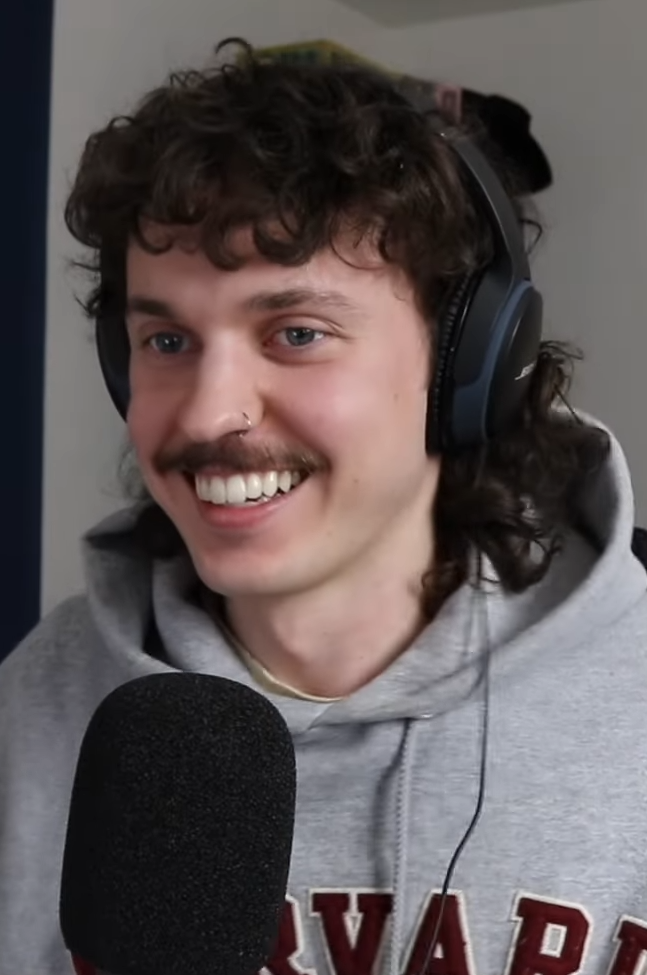
- Conner in March 2022
- Born: Kurtis Matthew Kenneth Conner; May 4, 1994 (age 32); North York, Ontario, Canada
- Other name: 3Drinkz
- Occupations: Comedian; YouTuber; podcaster
- Spouse: Jenna Allard (m. 2022)

YouTube information
- Channel: Kurtis Conner
- Years active: 2013–present
- Genres: Comedy; commentary
- Subscribers: 5.69 million
- Views: 1.23 billion
- Last updated: September 26, 2026
- Website: kurtisconner.com

Kurtis Matthew Kenneth Conner (born May 4, 1994) is a Canadian comedian, YouTuber, and podcaster. As of August 2026, his YouTube channel has accumulated over 5.67 million subscribers and over 1.20 billion views.

== Early life ==
Kurtis Matthew Kenneth Conner was born at North York General Hospital in the North York district of Toronto, Ontario, Canada, on May 4, 1994. He has an older sister. He grew up in Whitby, Ontario until around the age of 12, when he moved to Hamilton, Ontario, where he lived until he was around 20. He was named after American actor Kurt Russell.

== Internet career ==
=== Early online career (2013–2017) ===
Conner began social media on Vine, a now-defunct app that hosted only short-form videos. He amassed around 350,000 followers on the platform, but he later decided to attempt to create long-form content on YouTube.

Conner uploaded the first video on his channel in 2014. He originally made videos for fun after his full-time office job and uploaded around every week. His channel began to gain momentum in 2017 when one of his videos gained 600 thousand views in two days, leading him to increase his video output. Conner then decided to quit his office job to become a full-time YouTuber.

=== YouTube (2017–present) ===
His channel has become known for criticizing content perceived as problematic on YouTube and for making fun of those who wish to marginalize groups of people. In 2019, Conner and his friend and fellow comedian Jacob Sharpe criticized TikToker Sebastian Bails and Bails's girlfriend Lauren Godwin for making light of domestic abuse on their YouTube channel. Conner and Sharpe were both disturbed by the content, frequently commenting in the video that they found it difficult to make light of such a serious subject. Conner later said he would raise $10,000 for the domestic abuse charity loveisrespect and then match it with his own donation, with over $16,000 being raised and Conner making a donation of $26,000 overall.

Conner also criticized a "female Viagra" trend on YouTube, which involved YouTubers administering a claimed aphrodisiac for women by spiking their girlfriend's drink without their consent. His video was later removed from YouTube as it showed the controversial behavior, although other "female Viagra" videos were still available on the platform at the time.

Conner has made more lighthearted videos and said his favorite content is film criticism. He has created content about the TikTok Hype House, manipulative tactics used by Justin Bieber's team to promote his song "Yummy", the 22 Convention (a "convention for women" run by anti-feminist men's rights activists), and pick-up artist Russell Hartley (whom Conner dubbed "misogynist of the year").

During the COVID-19 pandemic, Conner posted a video detailing how to become famous online. In April 2021, he and Danny Gonzalez produced the song "In Love with a Creeper", which features them competing for the affections of (and eventually having a threesome with) a creeper from the video game Minecraft.

Conner began hosting a podcast entitled Very Really Good in 2018.

=== Content ===
Kurtis Conner was described by Lindsay Dodgson of Insider as "one of YouTube's most popular commentators". Like YouTubers Drew Gooden and Danny Gonzalez, he took a more lighthearted and comedic approach to the commentary genre and used a deadpan delivery.

== Stand-up comedy ==
Conner first performed stand-up comedy in 2013, at the age of 19, and later joined Humber College's Comedy Writing and Performance program. He self-released his debut comedy album Cuppla Jokes in 2016, which reached No. 1 on the iTunes comedy charts and No. 6 on the Billboard comedy charts. In 2019, he was a special guest and opening act for his friends and fellow YouTubers Danny Gonzalez and Drew Gooden during their We Are Two Different People Tour. Conner self-released the comedy special Kurtis Conner: Keep Busy in 2023. In 2024 he also self-released the comedy special Kurtis Conner: PYTHON on his YouTube channel. Starting in 2024, Kurtis Conner began the Goodfellow World Tour, with shows in North America, New Zealand, Australia, and Europe.

== Personal life ==
Conner started dating Jenna Allard on December 11, 2014. They were married in Tuscany, Italy, on October 19, 2022. The two have a dog named Kiwi, and they live together in Ontario, Canada. Conner's stepfather died on June 6, 2023.

Conner is agnostic. He expressed solidarity with Palestine during the Gaza war. In May 2024, Conner and many other internet personalities participated in a campaign called Creators for Palestine, to raise money for Palestinian relief.

== Filmography ==
=== Films ===
Year	Title	Role	Notes	Ref
2023	James Chapeskie's Darkness	Ensemble Dancer	YouTube short film	
2023	Kurtis Conner: Keep Busy	Self	Comedy special	
2024	Kurtis Conner: PYTHON	Self	Comedy special	
2024	Cancer Jokes	Self	Comedy special	
2024	St. Bulges Day	Luke	Crave original	
2025	The Trades	Minty	Cameo	

=== Music videos ===
Year	Title	Artist	Role	Ref
2021	In Love with a Creeper	Danny Gonzalez	Self	
2024	Last Night	Danny Gonzalez as Fox Szn	3Drinkz	

== Discography ==
=== Singles ===
Year	Title	Ref
2020	"Blood Related"	
2022	"True Story (Pinocchio Diss Track)"	
2024	"The Real Tarzan"	

=== As featured artist ===
Year	Title	Ref
2021	"In Love with a Creeper" (Danny Gonzalez featuring Kurtis Conner)	
2023	"Feeling of Victory" (James Chapeskie featuring Kurtis Conner)	
2024	"Last Night" (Danny Gonzalez as Fox Szn featuring Kurtis Conner as 3Drinkz)	
