= Mia Rose Frampton =

Actress

- Occupation: Actress
- Years active: 2008–present

Mia Rose Frampton is an American actress. She is known for her role as Becca Keeler, the younger sister of Payson Keeler, in the ABC Family teen drama Make It or Break It, and for her role as Bridgette in the Lifetime television movie A Teacher's Obsession.

== Filmography ==
Film
Year	Title	Role	Notes
2010	Mad Dog and the Flyboy	Ashley	Short film
2011	That's What I Am	Mary Clear	
2011	Bridesmaids	13-Year-Old Girl in Jewelry Store	
2013	G.B.F.	Mindie	
2014	Tammy	Karen	
2018	The Row	Becks	as Mia Frampton
2018	Hope Springs Eternal	Hope Gracin	
2022	Coast	Kristi Lewis	

Television
Year	Title	Role	Notes
2009–10	Make It or Break It	Rebecca "Becca" Keeler	Recurring character; 10 episodes
2015	A Teacher's Obsession	Bridgette	Lifetime television movie
