= Up at Night (album) =

Studio album by Cimorelli
- Released: May 18, 2016
- Recorded: 2015–16
- Genre: Country; country pop
- Length: 50:38
- Label: Independent
- Producer: Matt McVaney; Andrew Krach

Cimorelli chronology
Renegade (EP) (2014)	Up at Night (2016)	Alive (2017)

Up at Night is the debut full-length album by pop music group Cimorelli. The album comes nine years after the group first began posting videos of themselves singing on YouTube, and features fourteen original songs. The album was announced via a live stream on the group's YouTube channel.

The album was released to fans on May 17, 2016, through PledgeMusic.

"Hearts on Fire" was the first track available to fans, and a download link was made available through PledgeMusic. "I'm a Mess" was released on April 1, 2016 and "Fall Back" was released on May 10, 2016.

The Up at Night pre-release listening party was held at the Big Machine Store in Nashville, Tennessee on May 14, 2016.

== Album artwork ==
The official album cover was designed by Charmaine Cheng and was shot by photographer Acacia Evans. Band member Dani Cimorelli designed the whole album booklet and the back cover of the album CD.

== Track listing ==
Up at Night
No.	Title	Writer(s)	Length
1.	"Up at Night"	Christina Cimorelli; Lauren Cimorelli; Dani Cimorelli	4:04
2.	"Make It Stronger"	Christina Cimorelli; Amy Cimorelli	3:30
3.	"I Like It"	Christina Cimorelli; Lauren Cimorelli; Dani Cimorelli; Katherine Cimorelli	3:16
4.	"I Know You Know It"	Christina Cimorelli	3:10
5.	"Hearts on Fire"	Christina Cimorelli	3:56
6.	"I'm a Mess"	Christina Cimorelli; Lauren Cimorelli	3:00
7.	"Sunsets and Heartbreak"	Christina Cimorelli	4:20
8.	"Acid Rain"	Lauren Cimorelli	2:56
9.	"Before October's Gone"	Dani Cimorelli; Christina Cimorelli	3:57
10.	"Easy to Forget Me"	Amy Cimorelli; Christina Cimorelli; Katherine Cimorelli; Lauren Cimorelli	4:04
11.	"Fall Back"	Christina Cimorelli; Katherine Cimorelli; Lisa Cimorelli; Amy Cimorelli; Lauren Cimorelli; Dani Cimorelli; John King; Matt McVaney	3:16
12.	"Headlights"	Lisa Cimorelli; Christina Cimorelli; Amy Cimorelli	4:06
13.	"Brave Heart"	Christina Cimorelli; Katherine Cimorelli; Amy Cimorelli	3:14
14.	"Worth the Fight"	Katherine Cimorelli; Christina Cimorelli	3:49
Total length:			50:38

== Music videos ==
Title	Year	Director
"Hearts On Fire"	2016	Christina Cimorelli; Lauren Cimorelli
"I'm A Mess"	2016	Christina Cimorelli; Lauren Cimorelli
"Fall Back"	2016	Samuel Ryan Willey
"Headlights"	2016	Seth Donald Dunlap; Jeremiah John Dunlap
"I Like It"	2016	Seth Donald Dunlap; Jeremiah John Dunlap
"Sunsets and Heartbreak"	2016	
"Before October's Gone"	2016	Seth Donald Dunlap; Jeremiah John Dunlap
"Acid Rain"	2016	Seth Donald Dunlap; Jeremiah John Dunlap
"Up at Night"	2016	Seth Donald Dunlap; Jeremiah John Dunlap
"I Know You Know It"	2016	
"Worth the Fight"	2017	

== Charts ==
Chart (2016)	Peak position
US Top Country Albums (Billboard)	24
US Heatseekers Albums (Billboard)	7
US Independent Albums (Billboard)	31
