= Drew Gooden (internet personality) =

American YouTuber (born 1993)

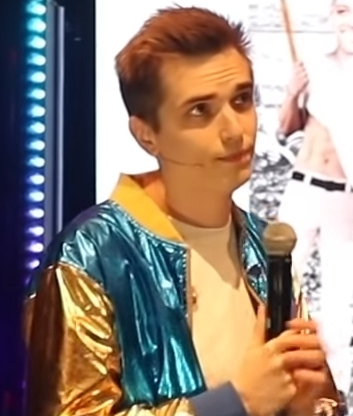
- Gooden in 2019
- Born: October 26, 1993 (age 33); North Carolina, U.S.
- Occupation: YouTuber
- Spouse: Amanda Murphy (m. 2019)

YouTube information
- Channel: Drew Gooden
- Years active: 2016–present
- Genres: Commentary; comedy
- Subscribers: 4.86 million
- Views: 1.16 billion
- Musical career
- Genres: Instrumental rock; post-rock
- Instrument: Guitar
- Member of: Arythmia
- Last updated: August 12, 2026

Drew Gooden (born October 26, 1993) is an American commentary YouTuber, comedian, and former Viner who makes comedic videos, mainly on internet culture and pop culture. His YouTube channel has earned over 4.86 million subscribers and 1.16 billion views as of August 2026.

Before YouTube, Gooden was a Viner best known for his "Road Work Ahead" Vine. He often collaborates with fellow YouTuber Danny Gonzalez; the two went on their We Are Two Different People Tour in 2019. In 2021, Gooden won the Streamy Award for Commentary.

== Personal life ==
Drew Gooden was born on October 26, 1993, in North Carolina, and has lived in Orlando, Florida, since moving there at a young age. He has a sister and a younger brother. Growing up, Gooden wanted to write for Saturday Night Live.

Gooden met Amanda Murphy (born July 24, 1994) in 2015 after she commented on one of his Vines and they started a long-distance relationship for over a year. The two got engaged in 2016 and married on March 10, 2019.

== Career ==
=== Vine (2013–2017) ===
After dropping out of community college two times and taking improv classes, Gooden joined Vine, a six-second video platform, in 2013. Gooden's videos ("Vines") were short comedy sketches—his first viral Vine depicted a Venn diagram of him and his favorite shirt, which both had in common a "mortal enemy" in Jeff Daniels. He described Vines as spontaneous, "the video equivalent of a tweet".

Gooden created what would become his most popular Vine in 2016. On the way to work in Arizona, he asked his girlfriend to record him driving past a "Road Work Ahead" sign and saying, "Road work ahead? Uh, yeah. I sure hope it does." The meme would later be described as one of the "most recognizable videos on the internet," although The Atlantic also called it "passably funny". Gooden remained known for the Vine several years later, calling it his "catchphrase" and selling merchandise based on it; he was recognized at VidCon as the "Road Work Ahead guy". He also found it annoying and wanted to separate himself from the video. According to him, the Vine was never as popular when Vine was still active but spread through Vine compilations on YouTube.

Gooden appeared in the Vine-produced web series Camp Unplug (2016), where he first met fellow Viner Danny Gonzalez. By the time Vine closed in January 2017, Gooden had amassed several hundred thousand followers. Besides a small Twitter account, he had no other online followings and decided to migrate to YouTube alongside many other Viners.

=== YouTube, stand-up, and music (2017–present) ===
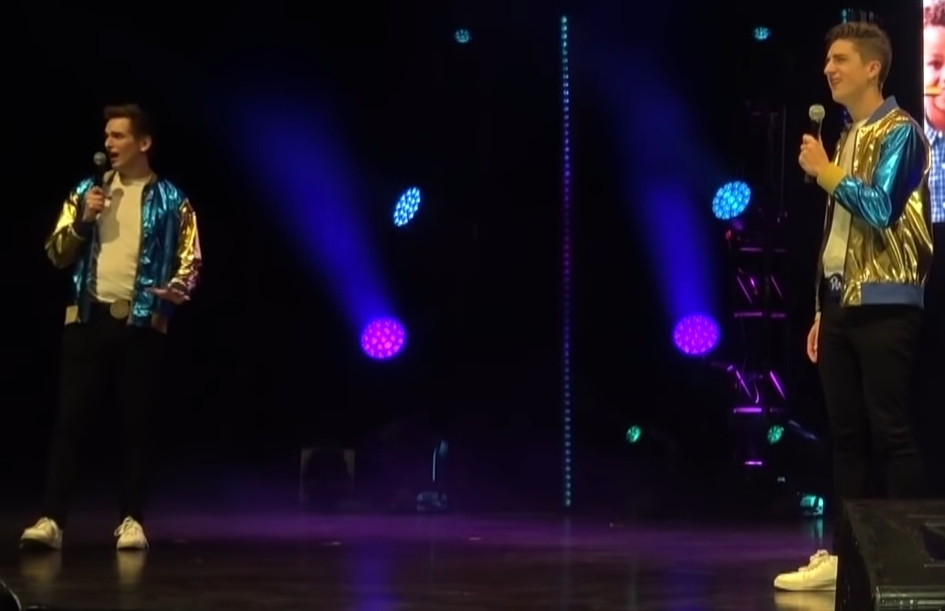
Gooden (left) and Danny Gonzalez (right) on their "We Are Two Different People" tour in 2019

Gooden experimented with different formats and types of videos. As he had wanted to transition to longform content, Gooden's initial idea was to create longer comedy sketches that were similar to his Vines. He eventually settled on being a commentary and reaction YouTuber and his following slowly began to rise again. Gooden's breakout video was a highly critical review of Jake Paul's live show, uploaded in June 2018. Unlike his other videos, which then averaged one hundred thousand views, the review was viewed four million times in one month. He reached one million subscribers in October 2018.

Gonzalez also started a commentary channel on YouTube and the two began traveling to appear in each other's videos, becoming close friends. Gooden said that making videos with Gonzalez was more enjoyable because they did not require a script. A running joke between their fans is that they pretend to confuse the two YouTubers together, but as of 2023 neither comedian appreciates this joke. This inspired their We Are Two Different People Tour in 2019, with YouTuber Kurtis Conner as a guest star. The tour, with music, effects, and theatrical elements interspersed with sketches and comedy routines, was their first major live performance and ran from September to October. The two also released a parody song called "We Are Not the Same Person" to promote the tour.

Gooden was a Featured Creator at the 10th Annual VidCon. Three years after starting YouTube, Gooden began creating content full-time. In 2021, he won a Streamy Award in Commentary. Gooden was nominated in the same category the next year but lost to Gonzalez.

Gooden plays guitar as part of instrumental band Arythmia, based in Orlando, Florida.

== Content and reception ==
Gooden is a commentary YouTuber. His videos mainly consist of "deep dives" into YouTube, internet, and pop culture. Gooden frequently discusses the difficulties internet celebrities such as Lilly Singh, Jake Paul, and Logan Paul face in breaking into mainstream media. He also covers TikTok creators and makes comedic summaries of poorly received movies.

His videos contain comedic elements and comedy sketches, and are usually filmed in his house. Paste described his videos as his "own comedic version of investigative journalism". He often shares his personal experiences in his videos, and discusses how online trends may be harmful, such as when he examines dangerous videos on YouTube aimed at children. Gooden was criticized by Kaitlyn Tiffany of The Atlantic for an advertisement in the middle of one of his videos, but he has said that he is careful not to be hypocritical as he has criticized celebrities for excessive advertising.

== Filmography ==
Year	Title	Notes	Ref.
2016	Camp Unplug	Vine series	
2020	The Pleasure Is Ours	Debut episode	
2025	Um, Actually	Season 10, episode 12 ("Terminally Online")	

== Discography ==
=== With Arythmia ===
==== Albums ====
Year	Title	Artist	Credits	Ref.
2025	Parasocial	Arythmia	Composer, electric guitar	

== Awards and nominations ==
Year	Award	Category	Result	Ref.
2021	Streamy Awards	Commentary	Won	
2022	Streamy Awards	Commentary	Nominated	
