= Jake Miller discography =

This is the discography for American hip-hop/pop musician Jake Miller.

== Studio albums ==
List of albums, with selected chart positions
Title	Album details	Peak chart positions		
Title	Album details	US	US Rap	US Indie
Us Against Them	Released: November 5, 2013; Label: E1 Music; Format: CD, digital download	26	5	3
2:00am in LA	Released: June 16, 2017; Label: Self-released, Empire; Format: Digital download	—	—	18
Silver Lining	Released: March 9, 2018; Label: Self-released, Empire; Format: Digital download	—	—	20
Silver Lining II	Released: June 18, 2021; Label: Self-released, Empire; Format: Digital download	—	—	—
BALANCE	Released: July 11, 2025; Label: Self-released, 88Rising; Format: Digital Download, vinyl	—	—	—
"—" denotes a title that did not chart, or was not released in that territory.

== Extended plays ==
List of extended plays, with selected chart positions
Title	Extended play details	Peak chart positions		
Title	Extended play details	US	US Rap	US Indie
Summer Session	Released: August 18, 2011; Label: Self-released; Format: Digital download	—	—	—
Spotlight	Released: July 29, 2012; Label: Self-released; Format: Digital download	—	—	—
The Road Less Traveled	Released: April 9, 2013; Label: E1 Music; Format: Digital download	55	6	11
Dazed and Confused	Released: November 4, 2014; Label: Warner Bros.; Format: Digital download	51	3	—
Rumors	Released: July 8, 2015; Label: Warner Bros.; Format: Digital download	119	7	—
Overnight	Released: August 19, 2016; Label: Warner Bros.; Format: Digital download	125	—	—
2:00am in LA (Acoustic)	Released: July 24, 2017; Label: Self-released, Empire; Format: Digital download	—	—	—
BASED ON A TRUE STORY.	Released: March 29, 2019; Label: Self-released, Empire; Format: Digital download	—	—	—
SUMMER 19	Released: September 19, 2019; Label: Self-released; Format: Digital download	—	—	—
BASED ON A TRUE STORY II	Released: November 4, 2022; Label: Self-released, Empire; Format: Digital download	—	—	—
Culdesac	Released: December 15, 2023; Label: Self-released; Format: Digital download	—	—	—
"—" denotes a title that did not chart, or was not released in that territory.

== Singles ==
Year	Title	Peak chart position			Album
Year	Title	US Pop	US Dig. Rap	US Dig. Pop	Album
2012	"A Million Lives"	—	—	—	The Road Less Traveled and Us Against Them
2013	"Collide"	—	—	34	Us Against Them
2013	"Me and You"	—	—	—	Us Against Them
2014	"First Flight Home"	30	37	—	Dazed and Confused
2014	"Dazed and Confused" (featuring Travie McCoy)	—	—	—	Dazed and Confused
2015	"Sunshine"	—	—	—	Rumors
2016	"Overnight"	—	—	43	Overnight
2016	"Good Thing"	—	—	—	Overnight
2017	"Can't Help Myself"	—	—	—	2:00am in LA
2017	"Lost Time"	—	—	—	2:00am in LA
2018	"Wait for You"	36	—	—	Based on a True Story
2019	"Nikes"	—	—	—	Based on a True Story

== Featured singles ==
Year	Title	Album
2013	"Lost In Love" (Big Time Rush featuring Jake Miller)	24/Seven (Deluxe version)
2013	"Up All Night" (Davina Leone featuring Jake Miller)	Awake
2014	"Castaway" (The Ready Set featuring Jake Miller)	The Bad & the Better
2015	"Wonderwoman" (Sweet California featuring Jake Miller)	Head for the Stars
2016	"Santa Claus Is Coming to Town" (DNCE featuring Charlie Puth, Hailee Steinfeld, Daya, Fifth Harmony, Rita Ora, Tinashe, Sabrina Carpenter, Jake Miller)	—N/a
2018	"Don't Know You" (Justin Caruso featuring Jake Miller)	TBA
2019	"Anything Anymore" (LZRD featuring Jake Miller)	Single only

== Non-album singles ==
Year	Title
2010
2010	"Sit Back and Relax" (as J Killa)
2010	"The Take Over" (as J Killa)
2010	"No Need To Be Gangsta" (as J Killa) (with J Kot)
2011
2011	"The Death of J Killa & the Birth of Jake Miller"
2011	"Dreamin"
2011	"Riddle Me Dat"
2011	"City Life"
2011	"Dream Big or Go Home"
2011	"Say The Word"
2012
2012	"Beast Mode"
2012	"Drive Thru"
2012	"Knock Out" (featuring Vers)
2012	"Whistle"
2012	"Hold On" (featuring Hi-Rez)
2012	"Like Me"
2013	"Settle Down" (featuring Hi-Rez & ProdaG)
2018	"Rock With You"
2021	"ADDERALL"
2024	"White Night"
