= Bart Baker =

American internet personality (born 1986)

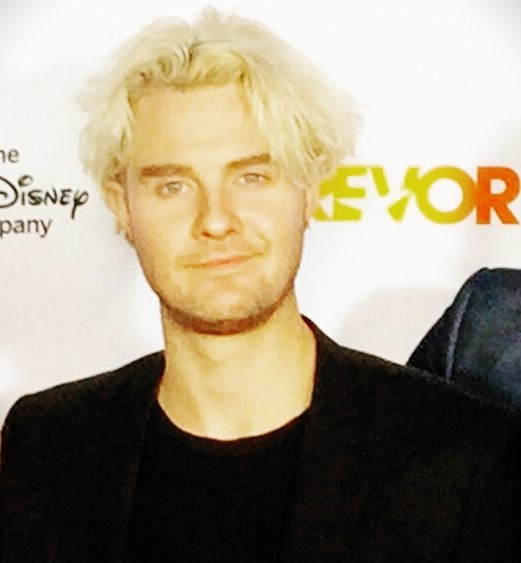
- Baker at Trevor Live in 2015
- Born: Bart Baker; May 5, 1986 (age 40); Chicago, Illinois, U.S.
- Other names: Master of Parodies, King of Music Video Parodies, Lil Kloroxxx
- Education: New Trier High School; University of Miami

YouTube information
- Channel: Bart Baker
- Years active: 2006–2018; 2021
- Genres: Music videos; parody; comedy; hip hop
- Subscribers: 9.73 million
- Views: 3.459 billion
- Last updated: September 19, 2026

Bart Baker (born May 5, 1986) is an American social media personality, musician, and comedian. He is best known for making parody videos of notable songs, for which Billboard dubbed him one of the most prolific makers of music parodies.

Baker is prominent on YouTube, where at one point his self-titled channel peaked at 10 million subscribers. Baker was also a top-earning broadcaster on the platforms Vine and Live.ly. His subsequent ventures include appearing in the 2016 film Laid in America, and uploading content onto the social media app Kuaishou and Douyin, where his English covers of Chinese songs have gained a following.

In 2018, Baker released satirical music on WorldStarHipHop and a new YouTube channel using the stage name of Lil Kloroxxx.

== Early life ==
Baker was born in Chicago, Illinois to parents, Janet and Walter Baker, on May 5, 1986. He attended high school at New Trier High School and film school at the University of Miami. After realizing the potential of video sharing on the internet, he started filming comedy videos in his backyard on a green screen. The Lonely Island was described as a 'big inspiration' to Baker when he first started.

== Career ==
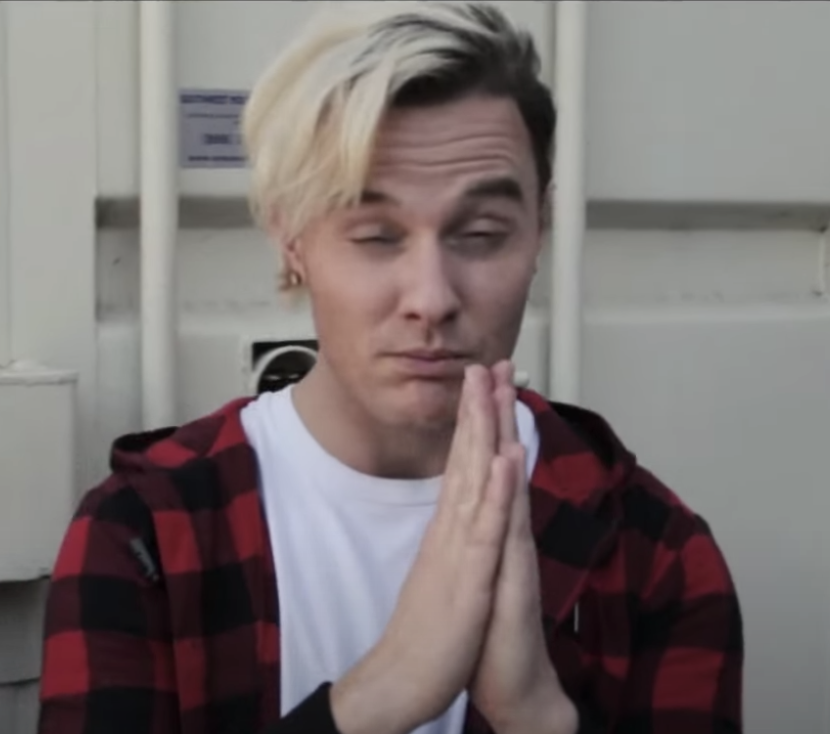
Baker portraying Justin Bieber in the music video for Mockstars' "Deadpool Epic Rap", 2016

The first video he posted on YouTube, "Look into My Eyes While I Masturbate", about men masturbating in a future world where robots have replaced all women on Earth, quickly received about 100,000 views. This encouraged Baker to make more videos. His second video was a parody. He has said, "I figured if I could do it right, my videos could do amazingly well... people want to subscribe to a channel they know has a certain programming structure. Mine is parody videos, and people love that".

Baker worked with his friend Austin Smith from the channel's launch until early 2011, when the duo mutually decided to part ways. During his time with Smith, they were sponsored and signed to RKShorts.com.

Not long after leaving RKShorts, Baker signed on with Maker Studios in Los Angeles and began recording with them. In 2013, Baker's parody of "Royals" by Lorde was taken down by Matt Pincus, CEO of Songs Music Publishing, for alleged copyright infringement. Baker responded by posting a video accusing Songs Music of not understanding US laws governing fair use and encouraging fans to tweet about it. A few days later, Songs Music released their take-down, and the parody was restored to Baker's channel.

It was reported on November 26, 2014, that Baker had reached one billion views in total on YouTube. Around the same year, Baker's videos aired on Music Choice along with a TV special titled Bart Baker's Funniest Videos. In 2015, Baker signed with Hollywood talent agency Creative Artists Agency. It was the second time in four months Baker had signed with a major Hollywood talent agency, the first being WME, when he was one of seven people who signed deals at about the same time. As of October 9, 2021, Baker has over 9 million subscribers and 3 billion lifetime views on his YouTube channel. Since starting the channel in 2009, he has created over 100 parody videos that have featured guest stars like Joan Rivers and Stan Lee. Speaking about YouTube, he said, "YouTube is honestly one of the only platforms that has proven it's not going anywhere". On September 23, 2016, it was announced that Baker would feature in a film titled FM starring fellow internet personalities Jason Nash and Brandon Calvillo.

On September 6, 2019, Vice News reported that after YouTube's demonetization of several YouTubers to satisfy family-friendly advertisers, Baker shifted his career to the Chinese market. His works consist of translating and singing Chinese songs on the social media app Kuaishou, and his English covers of Chinese songs have been gaining a following on Douyin. He moved to Shanghai to further develop his career as an internet content creator in China. Since Baker had moved to the Chinese market following the drastic change of YouTube's policies to satisfy family-friendly advertisers, his channel had dropped from 10 to 9.8 million (as of August 31, 2024). On August 29, 2021, Baker uploaded his first YouTube video in over three years. He announced that he would be returning to the United States in September 2021, and added that he would be able to afford making new content, including occasional parodies, using cryptocurrency. Baker's most recent music video, "PolyDoge", was released in November 2021.

== Other ventures ==
In November 2016, Baker released his first non-parody single, titled "Drake". It is also the debut single from his first album, titled Celebritease. He partnered with Music Choice, a multi-platform video and music network, to serve as the exclusive TV distribution partner for his single. The next month, "Kimye", was released as a single from "Celebritease". The album was subsequently released through his own record label alongside indie label 26 Music, a division of 26 Entertainment. The songs featured on the album are all named after celebrities except the final track, "#DWBD (Don't Worry Bout Dat)". On March 18, 2017, the album peaked at number 4 on the Billboard Comedy Albums chart. In 2018, Baker collaborated with producer Jason Nelken to create an official rap persona known as Lil Kloroxxx. The video for his song "Popper" was released on the WorldStarHipHop YouTube channel on July 21. He then went on to release two more songs nearly a month later, "4 Xanny" and "Prom Queen". Online sources have said that Lil Kloroxxx is fake and heavily spoofs off of SoundCloud rappers such as 6ix9ine and Lil Pump, but Baker himself has confirmed that this persona is "real".

In 2016, Baker announced he was running for President of the United States by setting up a large billboard in Times Square, dressed in American-flag boxer-shorts. He believed that his presidential candidacy would shed light on the nature of celebrity and how it has influenced the election cycle. In a 2015 livestream podcast, Baker discussed his involvement with "Fuck Cancer", a nonprofit charity that is dedicated to early detection, prevention, and providing support to those affected by cancer, and an online fundraiser where fans could participate to win an appearance in one of his videos while donating money to the cause. The disease has impacted people in his own life including his mother, who survived breast cancer when he was a child.

== Filmography ==
=== Film ===
Title	Year	Role
Laid in America	2016	Blindr Spokesperson
FML	2016	Swagg

=== Television ===
Title	Year	Role
Remix the Movies	2013	Agent
YouTubers React	2014	Himself
In Bed with Joan	2014	Himself
TakePart Live	2014	Himself
CrashPad	2014	Himself
Ear Biscuits	2015	Himself
Teens Wanna Know	2015	Himself

=== Music videos ===
(Not including parodies or Lil Kloroxxx songs)

Title	Artist	Year
"Fireball"	Pitbull ft. John Ryan	2014
"Friends with Benefits"	KSI	2016

== Discography ==
=== Studio albums ===
(not including "Greatest Hits 2014" album)

Title	Details
Celebritease	Released: March 1, 2017; Label: 26 Music, LLC; Format: Digital download, CD

=== Singles ===
(Not including parodies)

Title	Year	Album
"Drake"	2016	Celebritease
"Kimye"	2016	Celebritease
"Popper" (as Lil Kloroxxx)	2018	non-album singles
"Prom Queen" (as Lil Kloroxxx)	2018	non-album singles
"Savior" (as Lil Kloroxxx)	2018	non-album singles
"Feelin U" (as Lil Kloroxxx)	2018	non-album singles
"Poly Doge"	2021	non-album singles

=== Parodies ===
Parodies
Title	Original artist	Release date
"Big Old Pubes" (parody of "Boom Boom Pow")	Black Eyed Peas	June 30, 2009
"ChiK KoK" (parody of "Tik Tok")	Kesha	January 21, 2010
"Teenie Weenie" (parody of "Eenie Meenie")	Sean Kingston and Justin Bieber	June 21, 2010
"California Boys" (parody of "California Gurls")	Katy Perry featuring Snoop Dogg	July 3, 2010
"Horny" (parody of "Baby")	Justin Bieber featuring Ludacris	July 29, 2010
"Used To Be a Guy" (parody of "Love the Way You Lie")	Eminem featuring Rihanna	September 9, 2010
"Only Boy (In The World)" (parody of "Only Girl (In the World)")	Rihanna	November 8, 2010
"Born this Way"	Lady Gaga	March 10, 2011
"Friday"	Rebecca Black	March 19, 2011
"E.D." (parody of "E.T.")	Katy Perry featuring Kanye West	April 25, 2011
"Anus" (parody of "Judas")	Lady Gaga	May 12, 2011
"The Jerk Off Song" (parody of "The Lazy Song"	Bruno Mars	May 24, 2011
"My Moment"	Rebecca Black	July 25, 2011
"Slutty Mom Anthem" (parody of "Party Rock Anthem")	LMFAO featuring Lauren Bennett and GoonRock	September 8, 2011
"Cameltoe" (parody of "Mistletoe")	Justin Bieber	October 16, 2011
"Sexy And I'm Homeless" (parody of "Sexy and I Know It")	LMFAO	November 22, 2011
"I Wear A Glove (When I Masterbait)" (parody of "We Found Love")	Rihanna	November 29, 2011
"Super Fake" (parody of "Super Bass")	Nicki Minaj	December 21, 2011
"My Grandpa's Super Gay" (parody of "The One That Got Away")	Katy Perry	January 8, 2012
"Bang Your Mom" (parody of "Turn Me On")	David Guetta featuring Nicki Minaj	February 10, 2012
"I'm a Stupid Hoe" (parody of "Stupid Hoe")	Nicki Minaj	February 17, 2012
"Fat Hungry Chick" (parody of "Rack City")	Tyga	February 24, 2012
"I Should've Worn a Condom" (parody of "Sorry for Party Rocking")	LMFAO	April 6, 2012
"Pussies" (parody of "Starships")	Nicki Minaj	April 13, 2012
"Senior Citizen Love" (parody of "International Love")	Pitbull featuring Chris Brown	April 20, 2012
"Hot Problems"	Double Take	April 27, 2012
"White Negro" (parody of "The Motto")	Drake featuring Lil Wayne	May 11, 2012
"Birthday Cake"	Rihanna	June 1, 2012
"Call Me Maybe"	Carly Rae Jepsen	June 22, 2012
"Boyfriend"	Justin Bieber	July 6, 2012
"What Makes You Beautiful"	One Direction	July 20, 2012
"Gangnam Style"	PSY	September 14, 2012
"As Long as You Love Me"	Justin Bieber featuring Big Sean	October 5, 2012
"Live While We're Young"	One Direction	October 19, 2012
"Little Things"	One Direction	November 9, 2012
"It's Thanksgiving"	Nicole Westbrook	November 16, 2012
"Scream & Shout"	will.i.am featuring Britney Spears	December 14, 2012
"Kiss You"	One Direction	January 18, 2013
"I Knew You Were Trouble"	Taylor Swift	February 8, 2013
"Thrift Shop"	Macklemore & Ryan Lewis featuring Wanz	March 1, 2013
"Started from the Bottom"	Drake	March 23, 2013
"22"	Taylor Swift	April 20, 2013
"Gentleman"	PSY	May 25, 2013
"What About Love"	Austin Mahone	June 28, 2013
"We Can't Stop"	Miley Cyrus	July 12, 2013
"Blurred Lines"	Robin Thicke featuring T.I. and Pharrell Williams	August 2, 2013
"Best Song Ever"	One Direction	August 24, 2013
"Applause"	Lady Gaga	September 13, 2013
"Wrecking Ball"	Miley Cyrus	October 5, 2013
"Pour It Up"	Rihanna	November 2, 2013
"Royals"	Lorde	November 23, 2013
"Bound 2"	Kanye West	December 14, 2013
"All That Matters"	Justin Bieber	December 27, 2013
"The Monster"	Eminem featuring Rihanna	January 18, 2014
"Adore You"	Miley Cyrus	February 1, 2014
"Confident"	Justin Bieber featuring Chance The Rapper	February 22, 2014
"Can't Remember to Forget You"	Shakira featuring Rihanna	March 8, 2014
"Dark Horse"	Katy Perry featuring Juicy J	March 22, 2014
"Happy"	Pharrell Williams	April 19, 2014
"Hello Kitty"	Avril Lavigne	May 17, 2014
"We Are One (Ole Ola)"	Pitbull featuring Jennifer Lopez and Claudia Leitte	May 31, 2014
"Fancy"	Iggy Azalea featuring Charli XCX	June 14, 2014
"Hangover"	Psy featuring Snoop Dogg	July 5, 2014
"Problem"	Ariana Grande featuring Iggy Azalea	July 20, 2014
"Wiggle"	Jason Derulo featuring Snoop Dogg	August 3, 2014
"Rude"	Magic!	August 17, 2014
"Break Free"	Ariana Grande featuring Zedd	August 31, 2014
"Anaconda"	Nicki Minaj	September 14, 2014
"Shake It Off"	Taylor Swift	September 28, 2014
"Booty"	Jennifer Lopez featuring Iggy Azalea	October 13, 2014
"Animals"	Maroon 5	October 27, 2014
"All About That Bass"	Meghan Trainor	November 9, 2014
"Love Me Harder"	Ariana Grande and the Weeknd	November 23, 2014
"Blank Space"	Taylor Swift	December 7, 2014
"Lips Are Movin"	Meghan Trainor	December 21, 2014
"Uptown Funk"	Mark Ronson featuring Bruno Mars	January 31, 2015
"Elastic Heart"	Sia featuring Maddie Ziegler and Shia LaBeouf	February 15, 2015
"Sugar"	Maroon 5	March 1, 2015
"I Really Like You"	Carly Rae Jepsen	March 21, 2015
"FourFiveSeconds"	Rihanna, Kanye West, and Paul McCartney	April 11, 2015
"Style"	Taylor Swift	April 26, 2015
"Big Girls Cry"	Sia	May 10, 2015
"Pretty Girls"	Britney Spears and Iggy Azalea	May 24, 2015
"Bad Blood"	Taylor Swift featuring Kendrick Lamar	June 14, 2015
"Feeling Myself"	Nicki Minaj featuring Beyoncé	June 28, 2015
"Bitch I'm Madonna"	Madonna featuring Nicki Minaj	July 19, 2015
"Where Are Ü Now"	Skrillex and Diplo featuring Justin Bieber	August 2, 2015
"Worth It"	Fifth Harmony featuring Kid Ink	August 16, 2015
"Can't Feel My Face"	The Weeknd	August 30, 2015
"Watch Me (Whip/Nae Nae)"	Silentó	September 13, 2015
"What Do You Mean?"	Justin Bieber	October 11, 2015
"Wildest Dreams"	Taylor Swift	October 25, 2015
"Hotline Bling"	Drake	November 8, 2015
"Focus"	Ariana Grande	November 22, 2015
"Hello"	Adele	December 6, 2015
"Sorry"	Justin Bieber	December 20, 2015
"Love Yourself"	Justin Bieber	January 31, 2016
"Stitches"	Shawn Mendes	February 14, 2016
"Hands to Myself"	Selena Gomez	February 28, 2016
"Work"	Rihanna featuring Drake	March 26, 2016
"Pillowtalk"	Zayn	April 9, 2016
"No"	Meghan Trainor	April 23, 2016
"Work from Home"	Fifth Harmony featuring Ty Dolla $ign	May 7, 2016
"Hair"	Little Mix featuring Sean Paul	May 29, 2016
"Ain't Your Mama"	Jennifer Lopez	June 25, 2016
"Sweatshirt"	Jacob Sartorius	July 9, 2016
"This is What You Came For"	Calvin Harris featuring Rihanna	July 23, 2016
"Me Too"	Meghan Trainor	August 13, 2016
"Kill 'em with Kindness"	Selena Gomez	September 3, 2016
"Hit or Miss"	Jacob Sartorius	September 24, 2016
"Side to Side"	Ariana Grande featuring Nicki Minaj	October 8, 2016
"Closer"	The Chainsmokers featuring Halsey	October 29, 2016
"Starboy"	The Weeknd featuring Daft Punk	November 19, 2016
"Juju on that Beat"	Zay Hilfigerrr & Zayion McCall	December 17, 2016
"Black Beatles"	Rae Sremmurd featuring Gucci Mane	February 4, 2017
"Shape of You"	Ed Sheeran	February 18, 2017
"I Don't Wanna Live Forever"	Zayn and Taylor Swift	March 4, 2017
"That's What I Like"	Bruno Mars	March 25, 2017
"I Feel it Coming"	The Weeknd featuring Daft Punk	April 15, 2017
"Humble"	Kendrick Lamar	May 20, 2017
"I'm the One"	DJ Khaled featuring Justin Bieber, Quavo, Chance the Rapper, and Lil Wayne	June 3, 2017
"It's Everyday Bro"	Jake Paul featuring Team 10	June 24, 2017
"Look What You Made Me Do"	Taylor Swift	September 23, 2017
"Gucci Gang"	Lil Pump	November 11, 2017
"Rockstar"	Post Malone featuring 21 Savage	December 23, 2017
"Finesse"	Bruno Mars featuring Cardi B	January 27, 2018
"Esskeetit"	Lil Pump	May 26, 2018
"This Is America"	Childish Gambino	June 9, 2018
"Fefe"	6ix9ine featuring Nicki Minaj and Murda Beatz	August 24, 2018

== See also ==
- Weird Al Yankovic
- Rucka Rucka Ali
