= Llena =

Llena is a surname. Notable people with the surname include:

- Antoni Llena (born 1942), Spanish artist
- Enrique Llena (born 1961), Spanish footballer and manager

Ḷḷena is also the Asturian name of the Spanish municipality of Lena

== See also ==
- La Llena (disambiguation)
- Luna Llena (disambiguation)
- Llenas
