= Hasta luego =

"Hasta luego" (see you soon) is a Spanish parting phrase which may refer to:

== Music ==
- Hasta luego, a compilation album by Los Rodríguez 1996

=== Songs ===
- "Hasta luego", song written by J. Hicks, sung by Hank Locklin on his 1967 album Nashville Women
- "Hasta luego", 1957 song by Donn Reynolds
- "Hasta luego", 1974 song by Hugues Aufray
- "Hasta luego", 1995 song by La Tordue
- "Hasta Luego", song by McBride & the Ride from Amarillo Sky
- "Hasta luego", 2015 song by Maître Gims from Mon cœur avait raison
- "Hasta Luego", 2017 song by J.I.D from DiCaprio 2
- "Hasta Luego", 2018 song by Tahiti
- "Hasta Luego", 2018 song by HRVY, featuring Malu Trevejo

== Other ==
- ¡Hasta luego!, 1950 book by K-Hito (Ricardo García López)
