= The Fliptones =

American songwriters and record producers

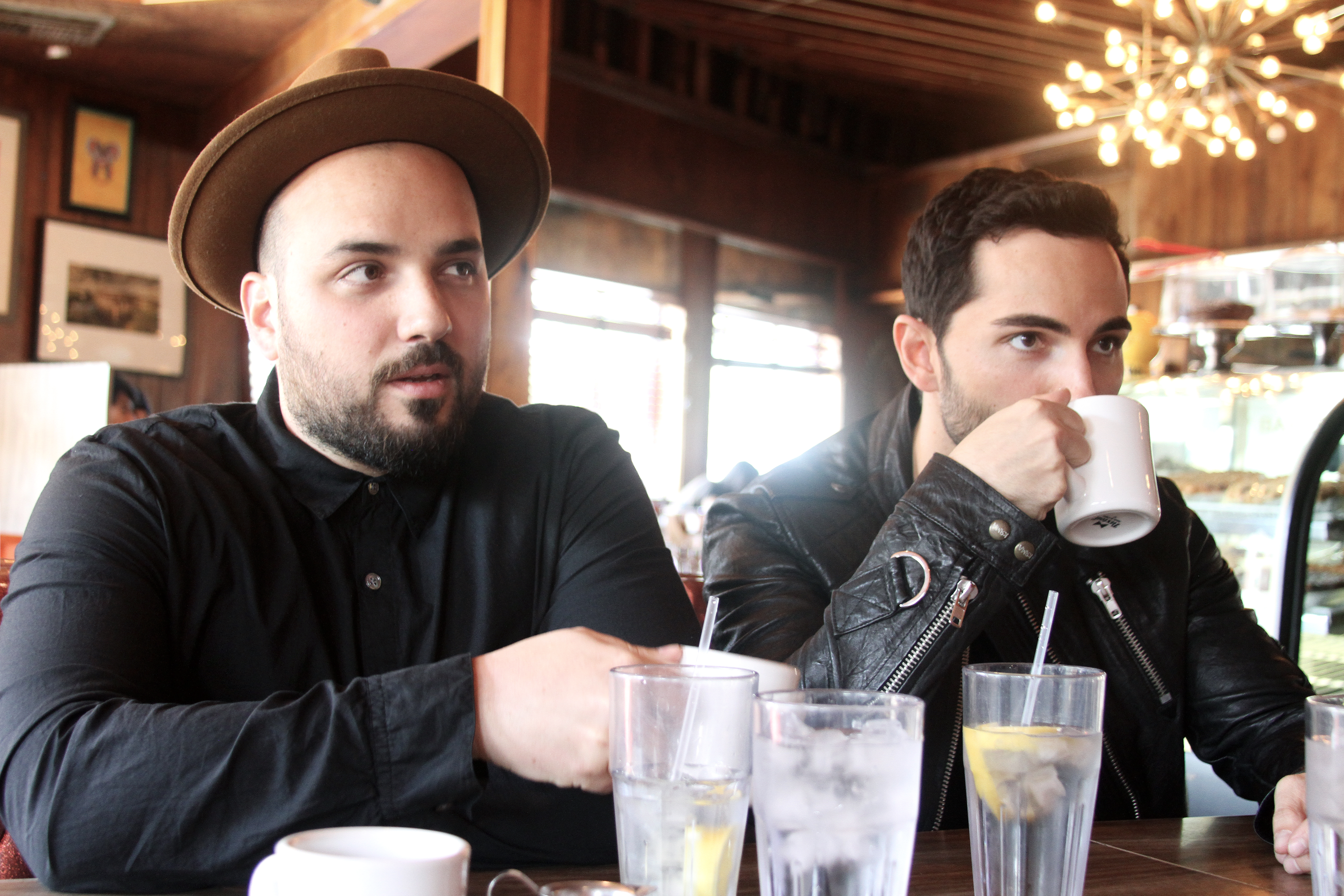
- The Fliptones: David Delazyn & Chaz William Mishan in 2016

Background information
- Birth name: Chaz Mishan, David Delazyn
- Occupation: Producers
- Instrument(s): Keyboards, Guitars, Drums, Programming, Saxophone, Trumpet
- Years active: 2008-present
- Labels: Universal, Sony, Warner, Atlantic, Capitol
- Members: Chaz Mishan; David Delazyn
- Website: The Fliptones on Instagram

The Fliptones were American record producers and songwriters consisting of Chaz Mishan and David Delazyn. Classically trained musicians, the duo have production and song writing credits with Jason Derulo, J.Lo, Flo-Rida, G-Dragon, Samantha Jade, Lil Wayne and Britney Spears. They were both born and raised in Miami but currently live in Los Angeles.

== Production discography ==
Song	Artist	Album	Accolades	Details
"Good Evening"	Shinee	The Story of Light	#1 South Korean Albums #3 Billboard US World Albums	Producer, Songwriter
"Flower Road"	Big Bang	Single	#1 Billboard World Digital Song Chart #1 China QQ Music Weekly	Producer, Songwriter
"Luna Llena"	Malu Trevejo	Single	#18 Billboard Hot Latin Song Charts	Producer, Songwriter
"Touch It"	Exo	The War	#1 Billboard US World Albums	Producer, Songwriter
"Born to Be Alive"	Samantha Jade	Nine		Producer, Songwriter
"M.U.P" (솔직하게; Soljighage)"	iKon	Welcome Back		Producer, Songwriter
"Good Boy"	G-Dragon & Taeyang	Single	#1 Billboard World Digital Song Chart	Producer, Songwriter
"Ride Until the Sun"	Justice Crew	Live by the Words		Producer, Songwriter
"Ghost"	Jake Miller	Dazed and Confused		Producer, Songwriter
"Love is a Lie"	Winner	2014 S/S		Producer, Songwriter
"Smile Again"	Winner	2014 S/S		Producer, Songwriter
"Stay With Me"	Taeyang featuring G-Dragon			Producer, Songwriter
"Beautiful"	Jessica Mauboy	Beautiful	Platinum (ARIA)	Producer, Songwriter
"Kiss Me Hello"	Jessica Mauboy	Beautiful	Platinum (ARIA)	Producer, Songwriter
"Collide"	Jake Miller	Us Against Them		Producer, Songwriter
"High Life"	Jake Miller	Us Against Them		Producer, Songwriter
"Homeless"	Jake Miller	Us Against Them		Producer, Songwriter
"My Couch"	Jake Miller	Us Against Them		Producer, Songwriter
"A Million Lives"	Jake Miller	Us Against Them		Producer, Songwriter
"Hollywood"	Jake Miller	Us Against Them		Producer, Songwriter
"Suitcase" (Target bonus CD)	Jake Miller	Us Against Them		Producer, Songwriter
"Don't Wanna Go Home"	Jason Derulo	Future History	#14 Billboard Hot 100 Chart	Producer, Songwriter
"Make It Up As We Go	Jason Derulo	Future History	#14 Billboard Hot 100 Chart	Producer, Songwriter
"I'm Givin Up"	Jason Derulo	Future History	#14 Billboard Hot 100 Chart	Producer, Songwriter
"X"	Jason Derulo	Future History	#14 Billboard Hot 100 Chart	Producer, Songwriter
"Overdose"	Jason Derulo	Future History	#14 Billboard Hot 100 Chart	Producer, Songwriter
"Edge of the World"	Jason Derulo	Future History	#14 Billboard Hot 100 Chart	Producer, Songwriter
"Give it to Me"	Jason Derulo	Future History	#14 Billboard Hot 100 Chart	Producer, Songwriter
"Can't Sleep"	JRandall featuring T-Pain			Producer, Songwriter
"What I Wouldn't Give"	Jake Miller	Kiss Me Once		Producer, Songwriter
"I'm Alright"	Jake Miller	Kiss Me Once		Producer, Songwriter
"Runnin'"	Jake Miller	Kiss Me Once		Producer, Songwriter
"My Life"	The Game feat. Lil Wayne (Songwriters)	Single		Producer, Songwriter
"Hey"	Ice Cube			Producer
"Nothin Like L.A."	Ice Cube			Producer, Songwriter
"Belly Dancer"	Rich Boy			Producer, Songwriter
"Amazing"	Black Dada			Producer, Songwriter
"We in the Club"	R. L. Huggar feat. Young Joc			Producer, Songwriter
"Raiders Nation- Oakland Raiders Theme song"	Ice Cube			Producer, Songwriter
"BAD GIRL"	Britney Spears feat. Lil Wayne			Producer, Songwriter
"Bling Blaw feat"	Lil Wayne & Birdman	Everything Is 4		Producer, Songwriter
"Danger"	Stat Quo feat Jason Derulo			Producer, Songwriter
"The Rain"	Donnie Klang	Just a Rolling Stone		Producer, Songwriter
"Spank Me"	Donnie Klang	Just a Rolling Stone		Producer, Songwriter
"Celebrity Love"	Donnie Klang	Just a Rolling Stone		Producer, Songwriter
"Algebra"	Jason Derulo			Producer, Songwriter
"Make Way feat. Fat Joe and Lil’ Wayne"	Birdman	Five Star Stunna		Producer, Songwriter
"So Tired feat. Lil’ Wayne"				Producer, Songwriter
"Bossy feat. Jason Derulo"				Producer, Songwriter
"Drop Top Chevy"	Flo Rida	Mr. Birthday Man		Producer, Songwriter
"This Boy's Fire"	Santana feat. Jennifer Lopez and Baby Bash	Ultimate Santana		Producer, Songwriter
