= List of most-followed TikTok accounts =

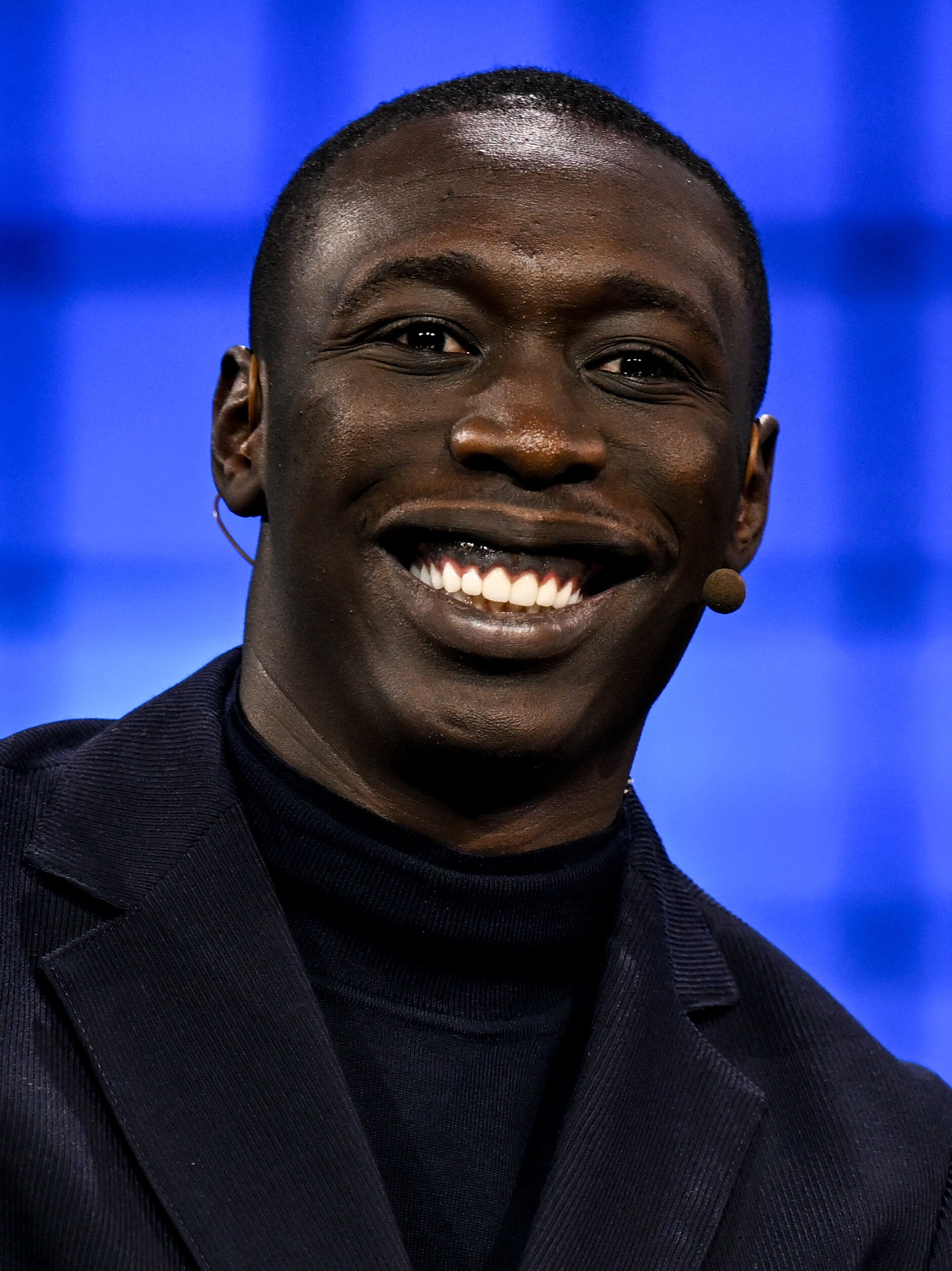
Khaby Lame is the most-followed user on TikTok.

This list contains the top 50 accounts by number of followers on the Chinese social media platform TikTok, which merged with musical.ly in 2018. As of 23 October 2026, the most-followed person on the platform is Khaby Lame, with 163 million followers. He surpassed Charli D'Amelio, the first user to reach 100 million followers, on 22 June 2022.

== Most-followed accounts ==
The following table lists the 50 most-followed accounts on TikTok, with follower totals rounded down to the nearest hundred thousand, describes each account, and gives its country of origin.

Most followed As of 23 October 2026
Rank	Username	Owner	Brand account	Followers (millions)	Likes (billions)	Description	Country
1	@khaby.lame	Khaby Lame		163	2.7	Social media personality	Italy; Senegal
2	@charlidamelio	Charli D'Amelio		160.3	12.4	Dancer and social media personality	United States
3	@mrbeast	MrBeast		145.9	1.5	Social media personality	United States
4	@tiktok	TikTok	Yes	96.7	0.46	Social media platform	China
5	@bellapoarch	Bella Poarch		91.5	2.4	Singer and social media personality	Philippines; United States
6	@addisonre	Addison Rae		87.6	5.3	Singer and actress	United States
7	@williesalim	Willie Salim		87.3	1.8	Social media personality	Indonesia
8	@zachking	Zach King		86.8	1.3	Social media personality	United States
9	@fifaworldcup	FIFA World Cup	Yes	84.7	3.3	International association football competition	Switzerland (International headquarters of parent organisation)
10	@kimberly.loaiza	Kimberly Loaiza		83.5	4.3	Social media personality	Mexico
11	@bts_official_bighit	BTS		81.1	1.8	Band	South Korea
12	@therock	Dwayne Johnson		79.7	0.68	Actor and professional wrestler	United States
13	@willsmith	Will Smith		77.9	0.66	Actor and rapper	United States
14	@realmadrid	Real Madrid CF	Yes	77.1	2.3	Professional football club	Spain
15	@domelipa	Domelipa		75.3	5.3	Social media personality	Mexico
16	@billieeilish	Billie Eilish		74.8	0.56	Singer	United States
17	@vilmeijuga	Meicy Villia		73.7	2.7	Social media personality and entrepreneur	Indonesia
18	@cznburak	CZN Burak		73.3	1.6	Social media personality	Turkey
19	@fcbarcelona	FC Barcelona	Yes	72.5	3.1	Professional football club	Spain
20	@lamine.yamal	Lamine Yamal		70.5	0.74	Footballer	Spain
21	@jasonderulo	Jason Derulo		66.3	1.4	Singer	United States
22	@espn	ESPN	Yes	61	6.2	Sports channel	United States
23	@kyliejenner	Kylie Jenner		59.7	1.8	Media personality, socialite, and businesswoman	United States
24	@omari.to	Aliev Omar		59.7	0.80	Social media personality	Kazakhstan
25	@championsleague	Champions League	Yes	59.2	2.7	Annual club association football competition	
26	@selenagomez	Selena Gomez		58.6	0.71	Singer and actress	United States
27	@youneszarou	Younes Zarou		57.6	1.3	Social media personality	Morocco; Germany
28	@shakira	Shakira		56.8	0.52	Singer, songwriter, and dancer	Colombia
29	@karolg	Karol G		56.3	0.54	Singer	Colombia
30	@psg	Paris Saint-Germain	Yes	56.3	1.4	Football club	France
31	@riaricis	Ria Ricis		54.9	1.8	Social media personality	Indonesia
32	@ishowspeed	IShowSpeed (Darren Watkins Jr.)		54.3	0.43	Social media personality, rapper, and streamer	United States
33	@bayashi.tiktok	Hiroaki Nakabayashi		54.5	1.8	Social media personality	Japan
34	@homm9k	HOMA		53.9	1.4	Social media personality	Kazakhstan
35	@dixiedamelio	Dixie D'Amelio		53.7	3.3	Singer and social media personality	United States
36	@netflix	Netflix	Yes	53.5	1.8	Subscription video on-demand streaming service	United States
37	@spencerx	Spencer X		53.5	1.3	Beatboxer and social media personality	United States
38	@roses_are_rosie	Rosé		53.4	0.74	Singer	New Zealand; South Korea
39	@lorengray	Loren Gray		52.7	3.1	Singer, dancer, actress, and social media personality	United States
40	@bp_tiktok	Blackpink		52.6	0.68	Band	South Korea
41	@brentrivera	Brent Rivera		50.9	1.8	Social media personality	United States
42	@kallmekris	Kristina Collins		50.3	2.5	Social media personality and hairdresser	Canada
43	@justmaiko	Michael Le		49.7	1.5	Dancer and social media personality	United States
44	@barstoolsports	Barstool Sports	Yes	49.6	10.5	Blog website and digital media company	United States
45	@brookemonk_	Brooke Monk		48.8	4.7	Social media personality	United States
46	@neymarjr	Neymar		47.9	0.29	Professional footballer	Brazil
47	@carlosferiag	Carlos Feria		47.2	2.7	Singer and social media personality	Colombia
48	@eooly	Lola		46.8	2.1	Social media personality	
49	@nianaguerrero	Niana Guerrero		46.5	1.3	Social media personality and dancer	Philippines
50	@laliga	La Liga	Yes	46.6	1	Professional association football league	Spain

== Historical most-followed accounts ==
The following table lists the accounts that were once the most-followed on TikTok, excluding the official TikTok account.

Before Khaby Lame became the most-followed TikTok user on 22 June 2022, Charli D'Amelio was the most-followed TikTok user. D'Amelio became the most-followed TikTok user on 25 March 2020 with 41.4 million followers, surpassing the previous record-holder, Loren Gray. Later that year, D'Amelio became the first TikTok user to reach 100 million followers.

Before Loren Gray, Lisa and Lena had the most-followed TikTok account, with over 32.7 million followers when they deleted it in March 2019, citing privacy concerns and their loss of interest in the platform. They rejoined TikTok on a new account with the same username on 7 May 2020.

Before Lisa and Lena, Baby Ariel was the most-followed TikTok user.

Current record for historical number of days held

Username	Owner	Followers (millions)	Date achieved	Days held	Ref(s)
@khaby.lame	Khabane Lame	142.4	22 June 2022	1,613	
@charlidamelio	Charli D'Amelio	41.4	25 March 2020	819	
@lorengray	Loren Gray	32.8	31 March 2019	360	
@lenamantler	Lisa and Lena	18.9	27 April 2017	703	
@babyariel	Baby Ariel	36.6	—	—	

== Most-followed accounts on Douyin ==
The following table lists the 20 most-followed accounts on Douyin as of 27 October 2026. Douyin is similar to TikTok, but intended for mainland Chinese users. They are both owned by ByteDance.

Rank	Username	Owner	Followers (millions)	Region
1	@rmrbxmt	People's Daily	200	China
2	@cctvnews	China Media Group	190	China
3	@xinhuashe	Xinhua News Agency	88.92	China
4	@doujiaxzs	DOU+小助手	78.68	China
5	@renminwang	People's Daily Online	74.572	China
6	@cxldb001	Chen Xiang	73.524	China
7	@cctv.com	CCTV+	73.522	China
8	@191433445	Chen He	69.19	China
9	@andylau.9.27	Andy Lau	68.95	Hong Kong
10	@AresCheng	Ares Cheng	65.72	China
11	@189251310	Tu Lei	57.93	China
12	@71158770	Li Ziqi	56.25	China
13	@dsmovie2019	DS Movie	56.13	China
14	@xiaohan96	Xiaohan Zhu	56.05	China
15	@895373343	Will Liu	53.90	Taiwan
16	@jianailiang2019	Jia Nailiang	51.70	China
17	@274110380	Dilraba Dilmurat	50.29	China
18	@1109Rosy	Zhao Lusi	50.16	China
19	@GEMdzq	G.E.M.	50.09	Hong Kong
20	@scgcnews	Sichuan Radio and Television	50.05	China
As of 27 October 2026

== See also ==
- List of most-followed Facebook pages
- List of most-followed Instagram accounts
- List of most-liked Instagram posts
- List of most-followed Twitch channels
- List of most-followed X accounts
- List of most-subscribed YouTube channels
