= Luna Llena =

Luna Llena may refer to:

- Luna Llena (album), 2007 album by Mariana Ochoa
- "Luna Llena" (song), 2017 song by Malú Trevejo
- "Luna Llena", 1994 song by Elida Y Avante
- "Luna Llena", 1998 song by Elvis Crespo from the album Suavemente
- "Luna Llena", 2005 song by Los Tucanes de Tijuana
- "Luna Llena", 2012 song by Baby Rasta & Gringo from the album Los Duros: The Mixtape
- "Luna Llena", 2021 song by Arca from the album Kick II
