= Loren Gray =

American social media personality (born 2002)

- Gray in 2026
- Born: Loren Gray Beech; April 19, 2002 (age 24); Pottstown, Pennsylvania, U.S.
- Other name: Loren Beech
- Occupations: Singer; songwriter; media personality
- Years active: 2015–present
- Known for: TikTok

TikTok information
- Page: Loren Gray
- Followers: 52.9 million

YouTube information
- Channel: Loren Gray
- Genres: Music; beauty; fashion
- Subscribers: 3.6 million
- Views: 159.4 million
- Last updated: April 8, 2026

Loren Gray Beech (born April 19, 2002) is an American social media personality, singer, and songwriter. Gray rose to prominence in 2015 on the video sharing app, Musical.ly. In 2018, she released her debut single "My Story" under Virgin Records, with whom she was signed until February 2021, when she became an independent artist. Forbes reported she earned $2.4 million in 2019, making her the fourth highest-earning TikTok star. In 2020, Billboard ranked her among TikTok's top 10 music influencers with over 50 million followers.

== Career ==
=== Social media ===
Loren Gray joined musical.ly (now known as TikTok) in 2015. After gaining a large following on musical.ly in the 8th grade, she began to get bullied at school. She eventually moved to Los Angeles, California and grew her other social media platforms. As of September 2022, she has more than 54.6 million TikTok followers, 23.4 million Instagram followers, 3.86 million YouTube subscribers, and over 1.5 million Twitter followers. On her backup Instagram, she has over 4.7 million followers. Gray is the seventeenth most-followed individual on TikTok and had been the most-followed TikTok individual from March 31, 2019 to March 25, 2020.

=== Music ===
In 2017, Gray appeared in English pop singer HRVY’s music video for "Personal".

In March 2018, Gray signed a record deal with Virgin Records before releasing her debut single "My Story" in August, which she says is based on a friend who "kept falling in love with the wrong people". In November 2018, she released her second single, "Kick You Out", which was written and produced by herself and Ido Zmishlany, and was described by Billboard as showing "the true highs and lows that come from being in love". Her third single, "Queen", an empowering anthem produced by herself and Captain Cuts, was released in December 2018. The video for the song, released the following month, received more than 18 million views as of July 2021.

Gray was featured on Lost Kings' single "Anti-Everything", released on January 11, 2019. She cites Eminem and Justin Bieber among her favorite artists. On April 4, 2019, Loren Gray released two new singles – "Options" and "Lie Like That". She teamed up with Captain Cuts (Walk the Moon, Halsey, The Chainsmokers) to write and produce both tracks, bringing in collaborators Nija (Jason Derulo, Chris Brown) on "Options" and Australian artist Ivy Adara on "Lie Like That". On May 17, 2019, Loren Gray released a new single titled "Can't Do It" featuring American rapper Saweetie. It marks her first single as a lead artist to feature another artist. After taking almost a year break from releasing songs, she released a new single titled "Cake" on May 13, 2020. She released her final solo single with Virgin Records and Capitol Records titled “Alone” on July 21, 2020. She departed from her music label in February 2021 and became an independent artist. She released her first independent song with TELYKast on March 12, 2021. She released her first solo independent song titled “Piece of Work” on July 9, 2021. On November 17, 2023, she released a collaboration with musician Hayes Warner titled "Breadcrumbs". The single premiered exclusively on NYLON. According to Billboard, she is one of the top 10 music influencers on TikTok, with over 50 million followers.

=== Brand ===
On December 3, 2020, Gray launched her own jewelry brand, &always. Her Instagram run business has a follower count of 23.4K followers as of March 2024. She had been working on the brand a year prior to release. When first launched, the brand released two editions: The Starlet Mirror Edition and Otherworld Edition.

=== Wealth ===
According to a Forbes report published in August 2020, Gray earned $2.4 million in 2019 from her numerous sponsorship deals and merchandise, making her the fourth highest-earning TikTok star.

== Awards and nominations ==
Gray was nominated for Choice Muser at the 2016 Teen Choice Awards and Muser of the Year at the 9th Annual Shorty Awards in 2017. In 2018, she was nominated for Choice Muser a second time at the 2018 Teen Choice Awards. She was nominated for the Social Star Award, a socially voted award, at the 2019 iHeart Radio Music Awards.

== Filmography ==
=== Music videos ===
Year	Song	Artist(s)	Director(s)	Ref.
2017	"Personal"	Hrvy	Ivanna Borin	
2019	"Million Ways"	Hrvy	Kenny Wormald	
2020	"The Man"	Taylor Swift	Taylor Swift	
2020	"Malibu" (At Home Edition)	Kim Petras	Kim Petras	
2020	“Follow Me”	Jamie Lynn Spears and Chantel Jeffries	N/A	
2022	“Beauty & The Beast”	Grace Gaustad	Van Alpert	
2024	"Days of Girlhood"	Dylan Mulvaney	Kajal	
2024	"Make The Angels Cry"	Chris Grey	The.97 & Chris Grey	

=== Web series ===
Year	Title	Role	Show Length	Service	Ref.
2019	Glow Up With Loren Gray	Herself	2 Seasons	Snapchat	
2021	LGTV	Herself	1 Season	IGTV	
2021	Honestly Loren	Herself	TBA	Snapchat	

=== Film ===
Year	Title	Role	Ref.
2024	Incoming	Katrina Aurienna	
TBA	Girl Group	TBA	Filming

== Discography ==
=== Studio albums ===
List of studio albums, with details
Title	Album details
Guilty	Released: April 21, 2023; Label: Independent; Format: Digital download, streaming

=== Singles ===
Title	Year	Album
"My Story"	2018	Non-album singles
"Kick You Out"	2018	Non-album singles
"Queen"	2018	Non-album singles
"Anti-Everything" (with Lost Kings)	2019	Paper Crowns
"Options"	2019	Non-album singles
"Lie Like That"	2019	Non-album singles
"Can't Do It" (feat. Saweetie)	2019	Non-album singles
"Cake"	2020	Non-album singles
"Alone"	2020	Non-album singles
"Dumb Bitchitis" (with yung cxreal)	2020	Non-album singles
"Nobody To Love" (with TELYKast)	2021	Non-album singles
"Piece of Work"	2021	Non-album singles
"Guilty"	2022	Guilty
"Told You So"	2023	Guilty
"Never Be Perfect"	2023	Guilty
"Enough For You"	2023	Guilty

=== As a featured artist ===
Title	Artist	Year	Album
"Love For The Summer" (feat. Loren Gray)	Deacon	2020	Non-album single
"No More One More" (feat. Loren Gray & Casey Veggies)	Rock Mafia	2020	Song for The Eternal Optimist, Vol. 2
"Feelings (Can I Be Honest?)" (feat. Loren Gray)	Hunter Hayes	2023	Non-album single
"Breadcrumbs" (feat. Loren Gray)	Haynes Warner	2023	Non-album single
