= Hrvy =

British singer (born 1999)

HRVY
- Born: Harvey Leigh Cantwell; 28 January 1999 (age 27); Kent, England
- Genres: Pop; dance-pop; R&B
- Occupations: Singer; songwriter; influencer; television personality
- Instrument: Vocals
- Years active: 2013–present
- Labels: Virgin EMI; BMG
- Website: hrvy.com

Harvey Leigh Cantwell (born 28 January 1999), known professionally as Hrvy (stylised in all caps), is an English singer, influencer and television personality. He presented Friday Download on CBBC from 2014 to 2015, and competed on Strictly Come Dancing in 2020, finishing in joint second place.

== Education ==
Cantwell is a former student of the Leigh Academy in Dartford, Kent, leaving in 2015.

== Career ==
=== Television ===
Cantwell appeared as one of six presenters of the CBBC television show Friday Download for Series 7 to Series 9. In 2017, he played the role of Miles on the American web series Chicken Girls in its first season. On 26 February 2020, he appeared in an episode of the CBBC singing show Got What It Takes? by surprising the contestants as they were learning his own song "Personal" for that week's sing-off. He was also a mentor in the same episode during a music video challenge.

In September 2020, it was announced that he would be competing in the eighteenth series of Strictly Come Dancing, partnered with Janette Manrara. They were the first pair to receive a 10 from any judge in the series for their Salsa in Week 4, and scored the first perfect 30/30 of the series in Week 6 for their Street routine. (Note: Due to the ongoing COVID-19 pandemic, Bruno Tonioli was unable to travel to the UK to take part as a judge, hence the maximum score was only 30 rather than the usual 40.) They finished top of the judges' leaderboard on three occasions, the most of any couple in the series, and also placed joint-first on the judges' leaderboard in the grand-final, scoring a total of 88 out of 90. With the exception of eventual winners Bill Bailey and Oti Mabuse, they were the only other couple in the series to never be placed in the bottom two in any week. The duo eventually finished in joint second place, alongside Jamie Laing with Karen Hauer, Maisie Smith with Gorka Márquez, losing out to Bailey and Mabuse in the public vote. In 2022 and 2023, he commentated CBBC and BBC Two's coverage of the Junior Eurovision Song Contest alongside Lauren Layfield.

In October 2023 he appeared, alongside Neil Parish, on Channel 4 in the second episode of the prison documentary Banged Up.

=== Music ===
Cantwell's music career began on 20 December 2013 with the release of his first single, "Thank You". In May 2014, he was a support artist for Little Mix during the Salute Tour alongside girlband M.O. After signing with Virgin EMI in February 2017, he released his debut Holiday EP which featured the singles "Holiday" and "Phobia". In November 2017, he released the Talk to Ya EP that included the single "Personal". In February 2018, Cantwell was named in The Courier and Newcastle Student Radio's The Sounds of 2018 at number six, alongside Rex Orange County, Brockhampton, and SG Lewis. In April 2018, he was a support artist for the Vamps during the Night and Day Tour alongside Jacob Sartorius, New Hope Club, Maggie Lindemann, and Conor Maynard. On 25 April 2018, he released the single "Hasta Luego", featuring Cuban-American singer Malú Trevejo. In September 2018, he released "I Wish You Were Here", promoted with a performance at BBC Radio 1's Teen Awards. Cantwell was also named on BBC Radio 1's Brit List at that time. That same year, he was listed in CelebMix's Top Success Stories of 2018, along with his management company, Alphadog Management.

In June 2019, he collaborated with South Korean group NCT Dream under SM Entertainment. The song, "Don't Need Your Love", was released on 6 June 2019. Cantwell was set to release his debut studio album, Can Anybody Hear Me?, on 20 November 2020, though it was cancelled.

In September 2021, he released the single "Runaway with It" that samples Shanice's 1991 hit "I Love Your Smile", which he performed at the 26th National Television Awards. In March 2022, he joined the Wanted on their Most Wanted: The Greatest Hits Tour of the UK.

On 28 January 2022, his third extended play, Views from the 23rd Floor, was released to coincide with his 23rd birthday. The two tracks, "Talking to the Stars" and "Golden Hour", preceded the EP. Following this was his collaboration "Save Me" with American DJ and record producer Steve Aoki; its official music video released the same day, 29 April. The song appeared on Aoki's seventh studio album Hiroquest: Genesis, which was released on 16 September that year. He released the single "I Wish I Could Hate You" on 5 August, the first song he released that he wrote by himself.

In December 2023, Hrvy announced on his Instagram feed that he had left his record label and was now an independent artist, making "Stolen Heart" his last song at label BMG Rights Management, HRVY then announced the release of his first song as an independent artist, "25", which was released on 9 February 2024.

== Personal life ==
From 2021 to 2025, Hrvy dated former Emmerdale actress Mimi Slinger, after meeting on the red carpet for the National Television Awards. The couple nearly split after a disagreement over Hrvy's participation in the Channel 4 prison documentary Banged Up. In November 2025, Hrvy announced their separation, citing Vogue's article about having a boyfriend being embarrassing as the reason for their split.

== Discography ==
=== Extended plays ===
Title	Details
Holiday	Released: 25 July 2017; Label: Virgin EMI; Format: Digital download, streaming
Talk to Ya	Released: 30 November 2017; Label: Virgin EMI; Format: Digital download, streaming
Views from the 23rd Floor	Released: 28 January 2022; Label: BMG; Format: Digital download, streaming
Bliss	TBA; Label: Warrior Music; Format: Digital download, streaming

=== Singles ===
Title	Year	Peak chart positions					Certifications	Album
Title	Year	UK	IRE	SCO	SUR	US Dance Air.	Certifications	Album
"Thank You" (Note: Credited as Harvey Cantwell.)	2014	73	—	—	—	—		Non-album single
"Holiday" (featuring Redfoo)	2017	—	—	—	—	—		Holiday
"La La La La (Means I Love You)" (featuring Stylo G)	2017	—	—	—	—	—		Holiday
"Phobia"	2017	—	—	—	—	—		Holiday
"Talk to Ya" (Note: "Talk to Ya" and "Personal" were included on HRVY's unreleased debut album Can Anybody Hear Me?.)	2017	—	—	—	—	—		Talk to Ya
"I Won't Let You Down"	2017	—	—	—	—	—		Talk to Ya
"Personal"	2017	62	94	33	—	—	BPI: Gold; MC: Gold; RIAA: Gold; RMNZ: Platinum	Talk to Ya
"Hasta Luego" (Note: "Hasta Luego", "Younger", "Unfamiliar", "Be Okay" and "Good Vibes" were included on the deluxe edition of HRVY's unreleased debut album Can Anybody Hear Me?.) (with Malú Trevejo)	2018	70	—	13	—	—		Non-album singles
"I Wish You Were Here"	2018	—	—	52	—	—		Non-album singles
"I Don't Think About You"	2018	—	—	—	—	—		Non-album singles
"So Good (Remix)" (with Danna Paola)	2019	—	—	—	—	—		Sie7e +
"Told You So" (Note: "Told You So", "I Miss Myself", "Million Ways", "Me Because of You", and "Nevermind" appeared on the standard edition of HRVY's cancelled debut album Can Anybody Hear Me?.)	2019	—	—	24	—	—		Non-album singles
"I Miss Myself" (with NOTD)	2019	—	—	—	—	—		Non-album singles
"Don't Need Your Love" (Note: Only the acoustic version of "Don't Need Your Love", without NCT Dream, appeared on HRVY's cancelled debut album Can Anybody Hear Me?.) (with NCT Dream)	2019	—	—	—	—	—		Non-album singles
"Younger" (Note: "Younger" appears on the deluxe edition of Jonas Blue's debut studio album Blue.) (with Jonas Blue)	2019	—	—	61	—	—		Blue (Deluxe)
"Million Ways"	2019	—	—	47	—	—		Non-album singles
"Me Because of You"	2020	—	—	3	—	—		Non-album singles
"Unfamiliar" (with Seeb and Goodboys)	2020	—	—	—	—	—		Sad in Scandinavia
"Be Okay" (with R3hab)	2020	—	—	—	—	—		Non-album singles
"Nevermind"	2020	—	—	—	—	—		Non-album singles
"Good Vibes" (with Matoma)	2020	—	—	—	—	—		Non-album singles
"Am I the Only One" (with R3hab and Astrid S)	2020	—	—	—	—	—		Non-album singles
"Baby, I Love Your Way"	2020	—	—	—	—	—		Non-album singles
"1 Day 2 Nights"	2021	—	—	*	—	14		Non-album singles
"Runaway with It"	2021	—	—	*	—	—		Non-album singles
"Talking to the Stars"	2021	—	—	*	—	—		Views from the 23rd Floor
"Golden Hour"	2022	—	—	*	—	—		Views from the 23rd Floor
"Save Me" (with Steve Aoki)	2022	—	—	*	—	3		Hiroquest: Genesis
"I Wish I Could Hate You"	2022	—	—	*	—	—		Non-album singles
"All or Nothing" (with Topic)	2022	—	—	*	13	—		Non-album singles
"Stolen Heart"	2023	—	—	*	—	—		Non-album singles
"25"	2024	—	—	*	—	—		Non-album singles
"Party in My Head"	2024	—	—	*	—	—		Non-album singles
"Dopamine"	2024	—	—	*	—	—		Non-album singles
"Magic"	2024	—	—	*	—	—		Non-album singles
"All For Me" (with Two Friends)	2025	—	—	*	—	14		Non-album singles
"Summer Night in Tokyo" (with Ferris Pier)	2025	—	—	*	—	—		Non-album singles
"Lie to Me"	2026	—	—	*	—	—		Bliss
"Hesitate"	2026	—	—	*	—	—		Bliss
"Bed You Made"	2026	—	—	*	—	—		Bliss
"Old Money" (with Ferris Pier)	2026	—	—	*	—	—		Non-album single
"Cynical"	2026	—	—	*	—	—		Bliss
"—" denotes a single that did not chart in the top 100. " * " denotes the chart not longer exists.

=== Guest appearances ===
Title	Year	Other artist(s)	Album
"Somebody"	2018	Sigala, Nina Nesbitt	Brighter Days

=== Music videos ===
Song	Year	Other artist(s)	Director(s)
"Thank You"	2013	—	Paul Akinrinlola
"Holiday"	2017	Redfoo	Unknown
"La La La La (Means I Love You)"	2017	Stylo G	Gilbert Sosa
"Phobia"	2017	—	Chris Brooker
"Talk to Ya"	2017	—	Chris Brooker
"I Won't Let You Down"	2017	—	Chris Brooker
"Personal"	2017	—	Ivanna Borin
"Hasta Luego"	2018	Malú Trevejo	Ivanna Borin
"I Wish You Were Here"	2018	—	Carly Cussen
"I Don't Think About You"	2018	—	Ivanna Borin
"So Good"	2019	Danna Paola	The Broducers
"Told You So"	2019	—	Ivanna Borin
"I Miss Myself"	2019	NOTD	Kaz Ove
"Don't Need Your Love"	2019	NCT Dream	Sang Yoon Roh
"Younger"	2019	Jonas Blue	Daniel Carberry
"Million Ways"	2019	—	Kenny Wormald
"Me Because of You"	2020	—	Matthias Hoene
"Be Okay"	2020	R3HAB	HRVY
"Nevermind"	2020	—	Matthias Hoene
"Good Vibes"	2020	Matoma	Moon
"Am I the Only One"	2020	R3HAB and Astrid S	Alfi Zachkyelle
"Baby, I Love Your Way"	2020	—	Unknown
"1 Day 2 Nights"	2021	—	Charlie Lightening
"Runaway with It"	2021	—	Jordan Rossi
"Talking To The Stars"	2022	—	Unknown
"Golden Hour"	2022	—	Unknown
"Never Be Us"	2022	—	Unknown
"Too Young For This"	2022	—	Unknown
"Sweet October"	2022	—	Unknown
"Views From The 23rd Floor" (Short Film)	2022	—	Unknown
"Save Me"	2022	Steve Aoki	Ava Rikki
"I Wish I Could Hate You"	2022	—	Unknown
"All Or Nothing"	2022	Topic	Kevin Ferstl
"Stolen Heart"	2023	—	Sillatape
"25"	2024	—	Unknown
"Party In My Head"	2024	—	Unknown
"Dopamine"	2024	—	HRVY
"Magic"	2024	—	Unknown
"All For Me"	2025	Two Friends	Unknown
"Lie to Me"	2026	—	Unknown
"Hesitate"	2026	—	James Velasquez

== Live concert streams ==
Show	Year	Location	Broadcast Date	Ref
Behind Closed Doors	2021	Royal Albert Hall, London	25 April 2021	

== Awards and nominations ==
Award	Year	Category	Nominee / work	Result	Ref.
Teen Choice Awards	2019	Choice Breakout Artist	Himself	Nominated	
