= Lisa and Lena =

German social media personalities

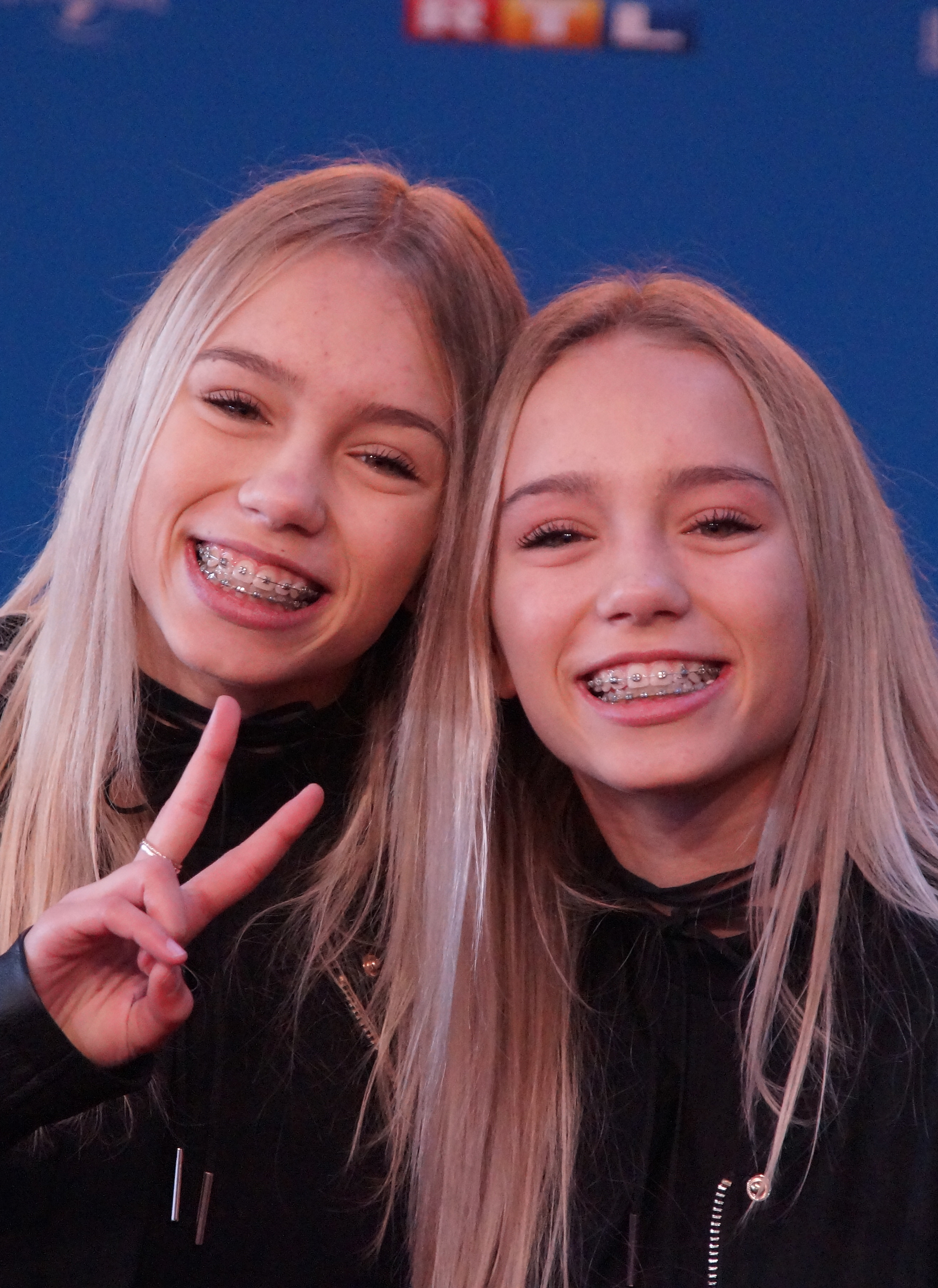
- Lisa & Lena in 2016
- Born: Lisa and Lena Mantler; 17 June 2002 (age 24); Stuttgart, Germany
- Occupations: Social media personality, singers, models
- Years active: 2015–present

Lisa and Lena Mantler (born 17 June 2002), collectively known as Lisa and Lena, are German internet celebrities who rose to prominence as teenagers on the video sharing application Musical.ly (now known as TikTok). They had over 30 million followers, making them the No. 1 most-followed creators at the time on the platform.

== Career ==
Lisa and Lena started making videos on 16 December 2015 on the app musical.ly, the predecessor of TikTok. They gained notability on the social media platform, becoming the No. 1 most-followed account on TikTok. Later, they announced that they would be deleting their TikTok account due to loss of interest in the platform and not wanting to support an app they viewed as unsafe. On 31 March 2019, they deleted their page. They had over 32.7 million followers. They rejoined TikTok on 7 May 2020, with the same username @lisaandlena. They amassed over 2.5 million followers and 12.6 million likes in just 24 hours of re-joining the app.

As of 6 July 2024, Lisa and Lena have over 13.2 million followers on their new TikTok account, 21 million followers on Instagram, 862k YouTube subscribers, 148.4k Twitter followers, and 18.4k Twitch followers. Lisa and Lena are inactive on YouTube, Twitter and Twitch.

Lisa and Lena launched their clothing brand, J1MO71, on 5 December 2016. They started teasing their new brand by posting to the J1MO71 Instagram account on 3 November 2016. They signed with WME in July 2017 and released their first single, Not My Fault, on 26 July 2017. This promoted their recently released clothing brand.

They created a movie that came out 18 June 2023 in German cinema. They previously denied offers by Disney for starring roles in their own television show.

In August 2023, Lisa and Lena announced that they would no longer collaborate professionally and pursue different careers.

== Awards ==
In 2016 the duo received the golden Bravo Otto as Social-Media-Stars. They also received a 2017 Shorty Award as Muser of the Year. They were nominated for Best Musers and Choice Musers at the 2017 Teen Choice Awards.

== Personal life ==
Lisa and Lena were adopted at the age of six months and have a biological half-brother, the German tattoo model Jayden Terrible. Lena was born just before Lisa. They are Protestant Christians and grew up as members of an Evangelical free church. They were baptised in 2021, though Lena has since left the free church.

In 2022, Lisa announced that she was engaged to Australian musician Jonas Jay. They married on 25 March 2023. After going public about her pregnancy in early 2024, Lisa gave birth to their son in November. In June 2026, she announced a second pregnancy. In October 2026 she announced to gave birth to their daughter.

In 2023, Lena worked as a backstage host for the Wetten, dass..? entertainment television program. In 2024, Lena worked as a model in New York City. As of 2025, she was a spokesperson for Miu Miu Beauty.
