= Malú Trevejo =

Cuban-American social media personality and singer (born 2002)

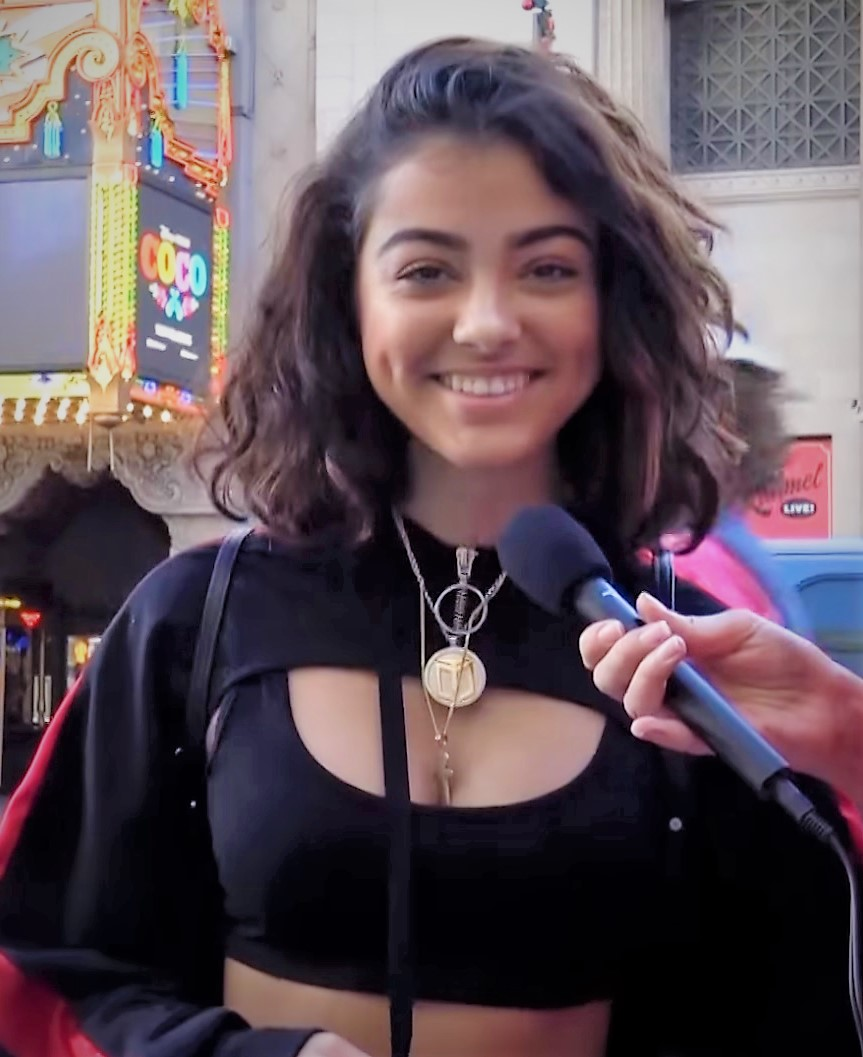
- Trevejo in 2017

Background information
- Born: María Luisa Trevejo; October 15, 2002 (age 24); Havana, Cuba
- Origin: Madrid, Spain
- Genre: Latin pop
- Occupations: Media personality; singer
- Years active: 2017–present
- Labels: Atlantic (current); Cactus Jack; The Hachar; BMG; In-Tu Linea; Universal Latin (former)
- Website: malutrevejomusic.com

María Luisa "Malú" Trevejo (/trɛˈvɛˌhoʊ/, born October 15, 2002) is a Cuban-American social media personality and singer. She became famous for her videos on the video sharing app Musical.ly. She is also an Instagram personality with more than 10 million followers. On September 22, 2017, she released her debut single, "Luna Llena" with In-Tu Linea and Universal Music Latin. It has acquired over 141 million views on her YouTube channel as of April 2026. Shortly after she released another single "En Mi Mente" which has surpassed 18 million views.

== Early life and career ==
María Luisa Trevejo was born on October 15, 2002, in Havana, Cuba, to a Cuban mother and Spanish father. She moved to Madrid, Spain with her mother when she was still a baby and lived there along with her father for 12 years. During her time in Spain, Trevejo showed a lot of interest in acting especially with skit videos she did with her friends, recorded by her parents. She began belly dancing at an early age, and uploaded videos of her engaging in this activity to the Internet, which garnered her first public attention. She stayed in Spain until she was 13 then moved to Miami, Florida with her mother.

Shortly after, she opened a Musical.ly (today known as TikTok) account, and gathered a following the eventually numbered in the millions. She posted lip-syncing videos and then became a verified user. Trevejo signed a recording agreement and co-management agreement with In-Tu Linea and Universal Music Latin at age 14. On September 22, 2017, she released her debut single "Luna Llena" which accumulated over 129 million views on YouTube.

== Career ==
On September 22, 2017, Trevejo's debut single "Luna Llena", which was produced by the Fliptones, was released. It reached 33 million YouTube views within seven weeks of release. Trevejo was recognized as one of Pandora Radio's 2018 Latin Artists to Watch. Trevejo indicated that her album would be in Spanglish, including both English and Spanish-language songs. In June 2017, she signed with In-Tu Linea and Universal Music Latin. "Luna Llena" debuted on the Billboard Hot Latin Songs chart at number 27 and sold over 2,000 downloads at the time. A re-make of the song called "Luna Llena (English Version)" was released for non-Spanish speakers.

On August 2, 2019, Trevejo released a four-track EP called Una Vez Más. Her single "Luna Llena" peaked at number 18 on the Hot Latin Songs chart for two consecutive weeks, and was certified gold and platinum within a month.

In October 2020, Trevejo signed with new management and relocated to the Los Angeles area. On her 18th birthday, she created an OnlyFans account, accumulating over 37,000 subscribers in the first week.

In October 2021, she reported on social media that she had signed to rapper Travis Scott's record label Cactus Jack Records and Atlantic Records. Later that month, she released her new song "Complicado" featuring Luar La L. The song was released under Cactus Jack and Atlantic. In November 2021, she parted ways with Cactus Jack Records.

== Discography ==
=== EPs ===
Title	Details
Una Vez Mas	Released: August 2, 2019; Label: BMG; Formats: digital download, streaming

=== Singles ===
Title	Year	Peak chart positions		Album
Title	Year	US Latin	UK	Album
"Luna Llena"	2017	18	—	Non-album singles
"Luna Llena (English Version)"	2017	—	—	Non-album singles
"En Mi Mente"	2017	—	—	Non-album singles
"Hasta Luego" (with HRVY)	2018	—	70	Can Anybody Hear Me?
"Nadie Como Yo" (with Gente de Zona)	2018	—	—	Non-album singles
"Swipe Dat"	2018	—	—	Non-album singles
"Como Tú Me Quieres"	2019	—	—	Non-album singles
"Down for Your Love"	2019	—	—	Una vez más
"Think About" (with Andrea Damante featuring Yung Miami)	2019	—	—	Non-album single
"Una Vez Más"	2019	—	—	Una vez más
"Hace Calor" (featuring Jeon)	2019	—	—	Una vez más
"Pa La Calle"	2020	—	—	Non-album singles
"Walking in the Club"	2020	—	—	Non-album singles
"A lo Malu"	2020	—	—	Non-album singles
"Mala" (featuring Haraca Kiko)	2020	—	—	Non-album singles
"Complicado" featuring Luar La L)	2021	—	—	MT1
"Culo Chapa" (featuring Haraca Kiko, La Perversa and Químico Ultra Meg)	2022	—	—	MT1
