= Llenas =

Llenas is a surname. Notable people with the surname include:

- Bryan Llenas (born 1988), American television news correspondent
- Francesc Llenas (born 1982), Spanish volleyball player
- Winston Llenas (born 1943), Dominican baseball player

== See also ==
- Llena
