= Khaby Lame =

Senegalese-Italian influencer (born 2000)

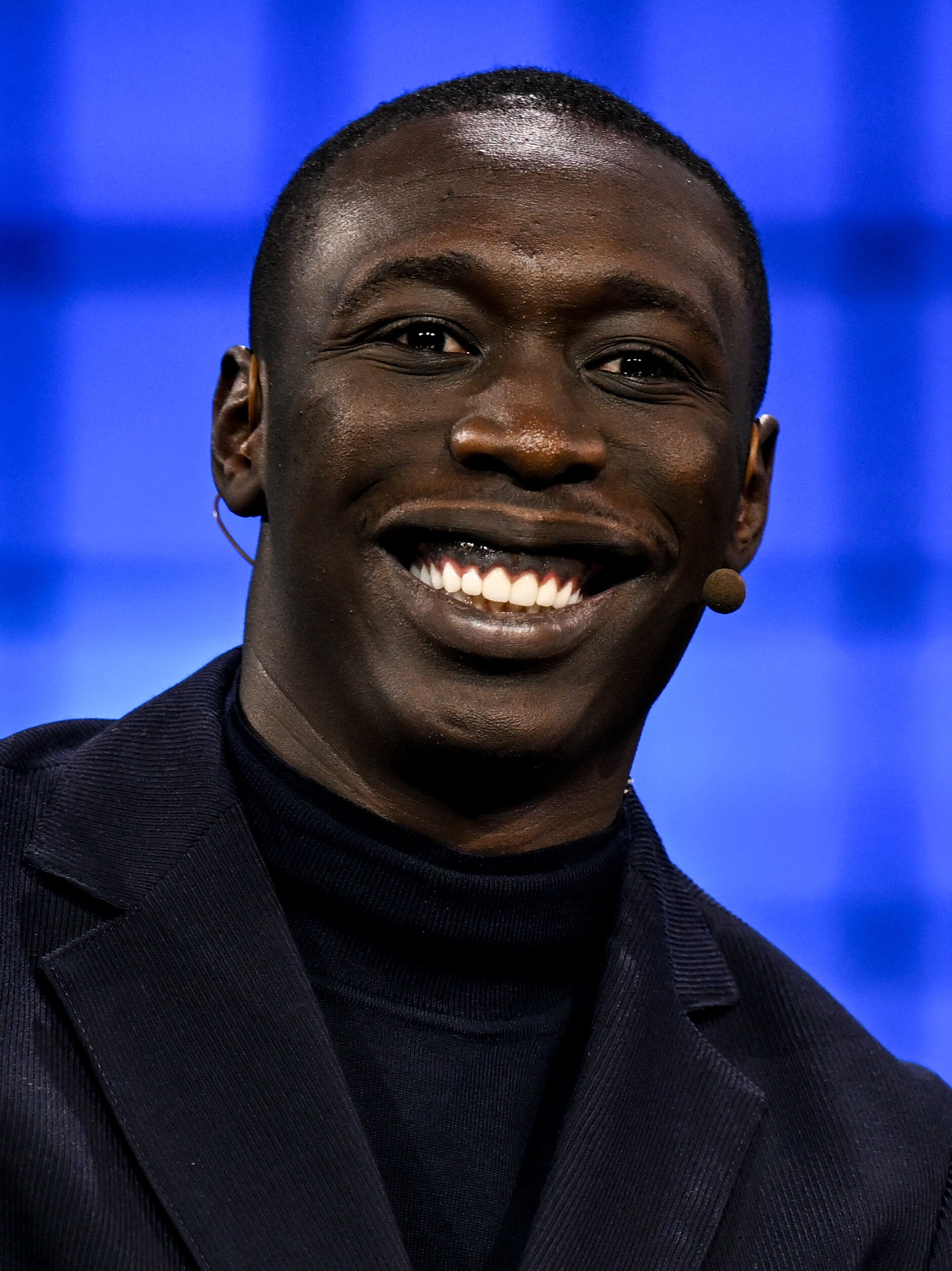
- Lame in 2025
- Born: Khabane Serigne Lame; 9 March 2000 (age 26); Dakar, Senegal
- Citizenship: Senegal; Italy
- Education: Madrasa
- Occupation: Influencer

TikTok information
- Page: Khabane lame
- Followers: 160.3 million

YouTube information
- Channel: Khaby. Lame
- Years active: 2022–present
- Genre: Comedy
- Subscribers: 12.6 million
- Views: 4.6 billion
- Last updated: 12 March 2026

Khabane Serigne "Khaby" Lame (French: [kabi lame], Italian: [ˈkaːbi ˈlaːme]; born 9 March 2000) is an Italian influencer and media personality. He is known for his TikTok videos, in which he silently mocks overly complicated "life hack" and other situational videos. As of 2026, he is the most-followed user on TikTok. In 2022, he was listed in Fortune's 40 Under 40 and Forbes' 30 Under 30. He also served as a judge on the 2023 edition of the television show Italia's Got Talent.

== Early life ==
Lame was born in Dakar, Senegal, on 9 March 2000. His family moved to Italy when he was one year old and lived in a public housing complex in Chivasso, near Turin. He has three siblings. He studied in Italian schools until he was 14, when his parents decided to temporarily send him to study at a madrasa near Dakar. Lame worked as a CNC machine operator at a factory near Turin, before getting laid off in March 2020.

== Career ==
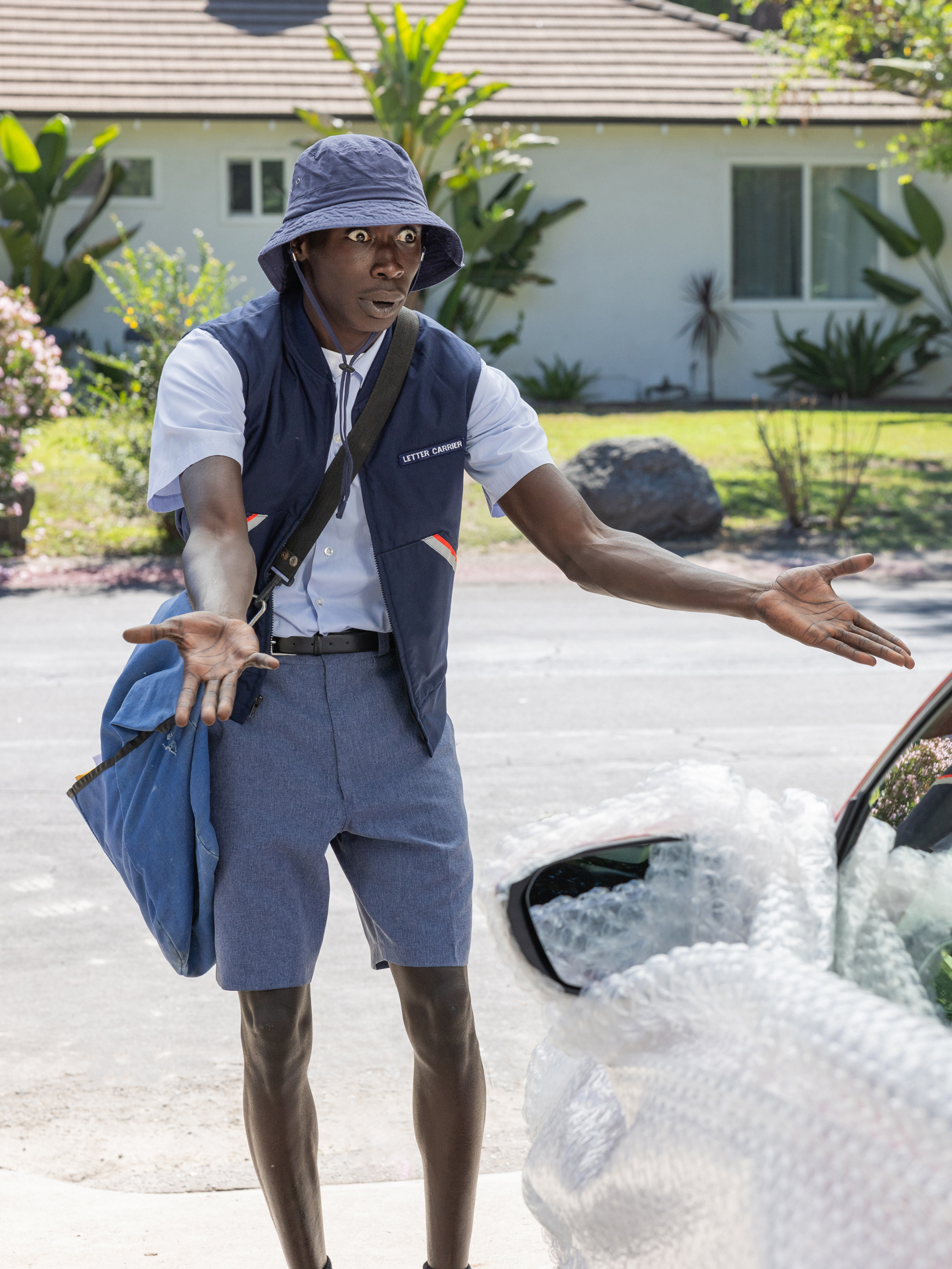
Lame performing his signature hand gesture while dressed as a mail carrier

After Lame was laid off during the COVID-19 pandemic, he began posting on TikTok. His early videos showed him dancing and watching video games. He rose to popularity with his video responses in the form of TikTok's "duet" and "stitch" features to videos depicting complicated "life hacks", in which he performs the same task in a simple way, without saying anything, followed by a signature hand gesture. In April 2021, he surpassed Gianluca Vacchi as the most-followed Italian on TikTok, and he subsequently surpassed Addison Rae, to become the second most-followed personality on the platform overall. In August 2021, Lame appeared as a co-star for Juventus FC's announcement of Manuel Locatelli. In September 2021, he attended the Venice Film Festival as a special guest for the first screening of the French film Lost Illusions, by Xavier Giannoli. In January 2022, Lame signed a multi-year partnership with Hugo Boss and was featured in the #BeYourOwnBoss campaign.

In 2022, he was listed in Fortune's 40 Under 40 and Forbes' 30 Under 30. In March of that year, he was awarded the Premio la Moda Veste la Pace, a recognition that the African Fashion Gate organization awards every year at the European Parliament. On 22 June 2022, Lame became TikTok's most-followed creator, surpassing Charli D'Amelio, with 142.1 million followers. According to Alessandro Riggio, the social media manager who signed Lame when he had only 1,000 Instagram followers, the TikToker was earning up to $750,000 per post and was on track to make $10 million by the end of 2022. Also in 2022, Lame served as a juror at the Cannes Festival, alongside Rithy Panh, where he judged TikTok short films. The same year, he won in the International category at the 12th Streamy Awards. He was nominated again for the award the following year.

Since 2023, Lame has served as a judge on the television show Italia's Got Talent. In August 2023, he was added as a cosmetic outfit in the 2017 video game Fortnite Battle Royale, as part of the "Last Resort" battle pass. In July 2025, he was named to the inaugural TIME100 Creators list, which recognizes 100 of the most influential digital creators from around the world.

In January 2026, Rich Sparkle Holdings entered into an agreement to acquire Lame's holding company, Step Distinctive Limited, for $975 million. The transaction, settled in stock, includes provisions for the creation of an AI "digital twin" utilizing Lame's biometric data for global commercial content.

In May 2026, IO Interactive announced that Lame would make a cameo appearance in the James Bond video game 007 First Light, in a scene set in Vietnam.

He is an ambassador for the 2026 Summer Youth Olympics in Dakar, Senegal.

== Public image ==
Taylor Lorenz and Jason Horowitz of The New York Times have attributed Lame's success to his "universal exasperated everyman quality" and described his rise to fame as different from most TikTok stars in being "entirely organic". Samir Chaudry, from the channel Colin and Samir and founder of The Publish Press, a newsletter focused on the creator economy, stated that Lame's appeal derived from his emphasizing "authenticity over production" and "not trying too hard". Christina Ferraz, founder of American marketing agency Thirty6Five, stated, "His exasperation is relatable, and feelings are universal." Lame has credited his popularity to his humorous facial expressions and his silence, which he has described as "a way to reach as many people as possible". As of January 2026, six of the 25 most-liked videos on TikTok are his.

== Personal life ==
Lame is a practicing Muslim. He has lived in Italy since he was a year old, and he is fluent in Italian. He was solely a Senegalese citizen living in Milan with his manager until August 2022, when he became an Italian citizen in Chivasso, after the Italian Undersecretary of the Ministry of the Interior Carlo Sibilia announced that he would be granted citizenship. Lame said he "always felt Italian" and has previously stated that he "did not need a piece of paper" to define himself as such.

In November 2023, it was publicly announced that Lame had married Wendy Thembelihle Juel. By May 2024, his marriage with Juel had ended.

On 6 June 2025, Lame was detained in Las Vegas, Nevada, by U.S. Immigration and Customs Enforcement (ICE) agents. An ICE spokesperson said that Lame entered the U.S. on 30 April 2025 and overstayed his visa, leading to his arrest. Lame was given a choice of self-deportation on the day of his detention, which he accepted, leaving the U.S.

== Filmography ==
Lame has a voice cameo in the Italian-dubbed version of Black Panther: Wakanda Forever (2022). He also makes a brief, non-speaking cameo appearance in the 2024 action comedy film Bad Boys: Ride or Die. On 28 June 2024, Lame's unscripted comedy series Khaby Is Coming to America premiered on Tubi. Lame also made a non-speaking cameo appearance in the 2026 video game 007 First Light.

== Bibliography ==
- Il diario di Khaby. C'è sempre il modo di non complicare le cose [Khaby's Diary: There's Always a Way Not to Complicate Things] (in Italian). Segrate: Mondadori. 2022. ISBN 978-88-0475-024-6.

== See also ==
- List of most-followed TikTok accounts
- List of most-followed Instagram accounts
