= Musical.ly =

Short form Chinese video social media platform (2014–2018)

musical.ly
- Logo
- Original author: Alex Zhu; Luyu Yang
- Developer: Musical.ly Inc. (2014–2017); ByteDance (2017–2018)
- Release: August 1, 2014; 12 years ago
- Final release: August 2, 2018; 8 years ago
- Preview release: April 2014; 12 years ago
- Operating system: iOS; Android
- Successor: TikTok
- Available in: 36 languages
- Type: Video sharing
- License: Proprietary
- Website: www.musical.ly

Musical.ly (pronounced "musically", stylized as musical.ly) was a Chinese social media service headquartered in Shanghai. It was a platform where users created and shared short lip-sync videos. The first prototype was released in April 2014, and then after that, the official version was launched in August 2014.

Through the app, users could create 15-second to 1-minute lip-syncing music videos and choose sound tracks to accompany, use different speed options (time-lapse, fast, normal, slow motion, and epic) and add pre-set filters and effects. The app also allowed users to browse popular "musers", content, trending songs, sounds and hashtags, and uniquely interact with their fans.

In June 2016, Musical.ly had over 90 million registered users, up from 10 million a year earlier. By the end of May 2017, the app had reached over 200 million users. ByteDance Ltd. acquired Musical.ly Inc. on November 10, 2017, and later merged the platform into TikTok on August 2, 2018. Following the integration, most of the original content uploaded to Musical.ly remained available on TikTok, and Musical.ly Inc. officially changed its name to TikTok Inc.

== History ==
=== Founding ===
Musical.ly Inc. was founded by Alex Zhu and Luyu Yang in Shanghai, China. Before launching Musical.ly, Zhu and Yang teamed up to build an education social network app, through which users could both teach and learn different subjects through short-form videos (3–5 minutes long). After having investors fund this venture, it took them about 6 months to build the product. However, once launched, this online self-learning platform did not get enough traction and the content produced was not engaging enough. They were unable to secure further investment, and after losing traction, they shut the service down. Zhu & Yang then began searching for a new business model in the consumer, social, and multimedia space. It led to them focusing on video content again, this time shorter (15s–60s), which they thought would help keep the content light and playful. They let users select music snippets for their videos, which helped build a very small user base. Eventually the product pivoted to lip sync snippets after noticing a spike in downloads Thursday evenings during and after episodes of the Spike celebrity game show Lip Sync Battle. The team's judgment at the time was that long music videos were not very widely popular before, and the fundamental reason was that although people are willing to watch short videos, the supply was small, as there were too few people who were willing to shoot and share. Therefore, Musical.ly's entry point was to introduce a large amount of music, so that everyone can easily integrate music into the video, and a video would become more fun. The first version of Musical.ly was officially launched in August 2014.

=== Growth ===
At the beginning, the team launched the app in both the Chinese and American markets. However, compared to the domestic market's tepid reaction, their app was particularly popular in the American teenager market. As their team size was small, they decided to mainly focus on the U.S. market. The product quickly accumulated a group of loyal users, and although the total number of the users continued to be not very large, the activity level of the users was very high.

In June/July 2015, the app began to attract millions of users, allowing "musers" (Musical.ly users) to lip-sync to millions of songs. Musical.ly climbed up to the number 1 position in the iOS App Store, becoming the most-downloaded free app in over 30 countries, including the US, Canada, UK, Germany, Brazil, the Philippines and Japan. In May 2016, Musical.ly reached 70 million downloads, with over 10 million new videos posted every day.

In June 2016, Coca-Cola launched its #ShareACoke campaign on Musical.ly, which introduced Musical.ly's "User-Generated Ads" model. On July 24, 2016, during VidCon, Musical.ly officially launched Live.ly, its new live video streaming platform. On Live.ly, users could live-stream to their Musical.ly.

=== Merger into TikTok ===
On November 9, 2017, the Wall Street Journal reported that Musical.ly Inc had been sold to Bytedance Technology Co., which operates the program Toutiao, for as much as US$1 billion. However, Recode estimated that the sale would be for around US$800 million. On August 2, 2018, Musical.ly and TikTok merged, with existing accounts and data consolidated into one app, keeping the title TikTok. This ended Musical.ly and made TikTok a worldwide app, excluding China, since China's separate version of TikTok is called Douyin. At first, the Musical.ly features were still present on the TikTok app, including crowns (Musical.ly's unique verification system), page categories, and duets. Eventually, TikTok removed crowns and replaced them with check marks. They also got rid of page categories and started implementing many other features, including LIVE broadcasts, favorites, reposts, stitches, voice effects, filters, and more.

As a result of the merger, Alex Zhu, the CEO of Musical.ly, became Head of Product for TikTok at ByteDance.

== Features ==
Musical.ly users could record videos of 15-seconds to 1-minute in one or multiple shots, lip-syncing to sounds or comedy. The platform also enabled editing, through 14 pre-set filters and effects that allow a change in speed or reversing the motion of the recording. Additionally, Musical.ly also had a feature to create shorter videos, named "live moments", which were essentially GIFs with music. Users could "remuse" (reuse) sounds created by other users, which instills a new level of engagement with the content. Other ways in which users could interact with each other were through features such as "Ask a Question" and "Duet". In this regard, Musical.ly had an option called "Best Fan Forever", through which users can select certain followers who can participate in duets with them. Users could also send private messages to their friends using the direct.ly feature. Musical.ly also had its own unique verification feature, in which a crown was showcased at the top of a verified user's profile. Users called this being "crowned." Users could save private videos or publicly upload them as well. This "private" saving feature is similar to the "drafts" on TikTok. Similar to the "for you" page on TikTok, Musical.ly had a "featured" page, in which specific videos were hand-picked and showcased on the page by Musical.ly officials based on their video quality. A featured logo would appear on the bottom left near the username.

== Reception ==
On January 28, 2016, Business Insider released a survey, in which "10 of the 60 [interviewed teenagers] listed Musical.ly as the app they were most excited about."

== Notable users ==
Active users with higher rates of popularity were assigned crowns by Musical.ly, which was the app's verification symbol. Some users of the platform gained great traction and a huge following not only within Musical.ly, but also outside it as well. Baby Ariel, also known as Ariel Martin who, in May 2017, had 19 million followers on Musical.ly alone, is one of several users who gained major media attention through Musical.ly. In April 2016, she was interviewed live on Good Morning America. Mackenzie Ziegler and Maddie Ziegler became more famous on Musical.ly when they finished Dance Moms. Jacob Sartorius, who later became a social media influencer, promoted his first single "Sweatshirt" on Musical.ly, after which the song reached number 10 on the iTunes Store. In June 2016, it was reported that Sartorius had signed with United Talent Agency. Loren Gray also started on Musical.ly and was at one point the most-followed individual on the platform after it became TikTok. Gray was also the first person to reach 40 million followers on the platform. Lisa and Lena started on Musical.ly and reached 32.7 million followers by the end of March 2019. They later deleted their account due to the "unfun" vibes of the app. They created a new TikTok page on May 7, 2020, and, as of March 2021, have over 12 million followers. Kristen Hancher is also a notable user, known for her "transition" styled lipsync videos. Hancher amassed over 18 million followers on the platform by 2017. In 2017, she collaborated with Logan Paul to promote his new song "Help Me Help You."

== Rights, permissions and licensing ==
In June 2016, Musical.ly signed its first major label deal with Warner Music Group, allowing its music to be licensed for use on the Musical.ly platform and the app users to interact with WMG's artists and songs. Besides continuing to work with the UK-based 7digital, Musical.ly also teamed up with Apple Music in April 2017 permitting users to sign up to the streaming service to listen to full songs and cut out a fifteen-second segment of the songs for lip-syncing on the Musical.ly platform.

== See also ==
- Dubsmash
- Instagram Reels
- YouTube Shorts
