= Lie to Me (Hrvy song) =

Single by HRVY
- Released: April 10, 2026
- Length: 2:51
- Label: Warrior
- Composers: Harvey Cantwell; Hampus Lindvall; Chelsea Balan
- Lyricists: Cantwell; Lindvall; Balan
- Producer: Hampus Lindvall

HRVY singles chronology
"Summer Nights In Tokyo" (2025)	"Lie to Me" (2026)	"Hesitate" (2026)

Lyric video
- "Lie to Me" on YouTube

"Lie to Me" is a song by British singer and songwriter HRVY. It was released independently on April 10, 2026 through Warrior Music, as the lead single from his upcoming fourth extended play, Bliss.

== Background and release ==
"Lie to Me" was written by Harvey Cantwell, Chelsea Balan and Hampus Lindvall in Sweden, with Lindvall serving as the track's producer. Sonically, the track presents elements of synth-pop and electronic percussion, with an upbeat tempo. Lyrically, Cantwell stated in the single's press release that the song is about "that moment when you know the truth, but part of you still wants to believe the illusion", and described it "one of the most honest songs I've written, it reflects real experiences and emotions I went through."

In an interview with Hindustan Times, Cantwell said of the track:

"'Lie To Me' is basically about wanting the fantasy over the truth. You know something’s off, but you’d rather stay in it than face reality. [...] It was actually inspired by my friend who was telling me a story whilst we was in Sweden. He was telling about a situation and I told him the honest truth and that he was wrong, which he jokingly replied 'I wanted you to lie to me, and tell me what I wanna hear' and I replied 'Thats a great song concept' and the next day I went into the studio and wrote the song."

— Cantwell on the track creative process, via Hindustan Times

It was released on April 10, 2026, alongside an accompanying lyric video. The song marks Cantwell first release since his 2025 collaboration with Ferris Pier "Summer Nights in Tokyo", and his first solo release in two years since "Magic" in 2024.

== Reception ==
The song received positive reviews. Lottie Webber of Music Is To Blame praised the track for its "breezy" and "danceable" sound, describing it as "a perfect song for the spring." Culture Fix also praised the song, highlighting Cantwell's "impressive" and "emotive" vocal performance, and Lindvall's "summer-ready crowd-pleaser" production, stating that it "truly welcomes HRVY back to the pop scene with a bang". OutInPerth included the song on their latest "releases worth checking out" list, calling the track "charmingly sweet".

== Personnel ==
Credits adapted from Apple Music.

- Harvey Cantwell — performer, composer, lyricist
- Hampus Lindvall — producer, composer, lyricist, drum programming, guitar, synthesizer
- Chelsea Balan — composer, lyricist

== Release history ==
"Lie to Me" release history
Region	Date	Format(s)	Label	Ref.
Various	April 10, 2026	Digital download; streaming	Warrior Music	
