= Personal (Hrvy song) =

2017 song by Hrvy

- Acoustic version cover

Single by Hrvy

from the EP Talk to Ya
- Released: 30 November 2017
- Length: 3:18
- Label: Virgin EMI
- Songwriters: Blair Dreelan; Danny Shah; Harvey Cantwell; Jordan Thomas; Justus Nzeribe
- Producer: Sky Adams

Hrvy singles chronology
"I Won't Let You Down" (2017)	"Personal" (2017)	"Hasta Luego" (2018)

"Personal" is a song performed by English singer Hrvy. The song was released as a digital download on 30 November 2017, by Universal Music as the third and final single from his second extended play Talk to Ya. The song peaked at number sixty-two on the UK singles chart. The song was written by Blair Dreelan, Danny Shah, Harvey Cantwell, Jordan Thomas and Justus Nzeribe.

== Music video ==
A music video to accompany the release of "Personal" was released onto YouTube on 30 November 2017. Loren Gray, Ariel Martin, and Luna Blaise appear in the video. It has since reached over 300 million views as of October 2022.

== Track listing ==
Digital download
No.	Title	Length
1.	"Personal"	3:18

Digital download
No.	Title	Length
1.	"Personal" (Sebastian Perez Remix)	4:13
2.	"Personal" (PBH & Jack Schizzle Remix)	2:38

Digital download
No.	Title	Length
1.	"Personal" (Acoustic)	3:06

== Personnel ==
Credits adapted from Tidal.

- Sky Adams – Producer, associated performer, background vocalist, bass (vocal), clapping, guitar, keyboards, mixer, programming, studio personnel
- Blair Dreelan – Composer, lyricist
- Danny Shah – Composer, lyricist, associated performer, background vocalist, clapping, guitar
- Harvey Cantwell – Composer, lyricist, associated performer, vocals
- Jordan Thomas – Composer, lyricist
- Justus Nzeribe – Composer, lyricist
- Dick Beetham – Mastering Engineer, studio personnel

== Charts ==
Chart performance for "Personal"
Chart (2018)	Peak position
Greece International (IFPI)	97
Ireland (IRMA)	94
Scotland Singles (Official Charts)	33
UK Singles (Official Charts)	62

== Certifications ==
Certifications for "Personal"
Region	Certification	Certified units/sales
Brazil (Pro-Música Brasil)	Platinum	40,000^{‡}
Canada (Music Canada)	Gold	40,000^{‡}
New Zealand (RMNZ)	Platinum	30,000^{‡}
Norway (IFPI Norway)	Gold	30,000^{‡}
Poland (ZPAV)	Gold	10,000^{‡}
United Kingdom (BPI)	Gold	400,000^{‡}
United States (RIAA)	Gold	500,000^{‡}
^{‡} Sales+streaming figures based on certification alone.

== Release history ==
Release history and formats for "Personal"
Region	Date	Format	Label
United Kingdom	30 November 2017	Digital download; streaming	Universal Music
