= Hesitate (Hrvy song) =

Single by HRVY
- Released: June 19, 2026
- Genre: Scandi pop
- Length: 2:51
- Label: Warrior
- Composers: Harvey Cantwell; Robin Stjernberg
- Lyricists: Cantwell; Stjernberg
- Producer: Robin Stjernberg

HRVY singles chronology
"Lie to Me" (2026)	"Hesitate" (2026)

Music video
- "Hesitate" on YouTube

"Hesitate" is a song by British singer and songwriter HRVY. It was released independently on June 19, 2026 through Warrior Music, as the second single from his upcoming fourth extended play, Bliss.

== Composition and release ==
"Hesitate" was written and performed by HRVY, under his real name, Harvey Cantwell, alongside Swedish record producer Robin Stjernberg, who also served as the song's executive producer. Stjernberg played the electric bass guitar and drums on the track. During an interview with Verus Ferreira of Free Press Journal, Cantwell described the track as being about "trusting your instincts and living in the moment instead of second guessing yourself". He explained that its sound was inspired by the "carefree energy" of letting things happen naturally if they are meant to be, a sentiment that also influenced his upcoming work. Culture Fix described the track as a "breezy gem that shimmers with summery, feel-good vibe", and one of Cantwell best tracks to date, highlighting the scandi-pop production..

It marks his second release of 2026 after "Lie to Me", which was released in April. Both songs are set to appear on Cantwell's upcoming extended play, Bliss, scheduled for release on September 4, 2026.

== Music video ==
An official music video for "Hesitate", directed by James Velasquez premiered on June 19, 2026 alongside the song's release. It features Cantwell performing the track in the streets and fields of Stockholm. According to the singer's press release, the video was filmed at around 2 a.m. with what he described as an "amazing little crew".

In the same press release, Cantwell reflected on the differences between making music videos as an independent artist and working with a record label, saying: "Being independent means there's no big fat lovely budgetor label footing the bill". He added that he still wanted to make them because he believed that "songs deserve a little world around them." Cantwell also thanked his fans for their support, commenting: "Thank you for supporting me and allowing me to keep doing what I love. I invest everything back into my art."

== Personnel ==
Credits adapted from Apple Music.

- Harvey Cantwell — performer, composer, lyricist
- Robin Stjernberg — executive producer, composer, lyricist, vocal producer, drums, electric bass guitar

== Release history ==
"Hesitate" release history
Region	Date	Format(s)	Label	Ref.
Various	June 19, 2026	Digital download; streaming	Warrior Music	
