= La Llena =

La Llena may refer to:

- La Llena Mountains, a mountain range above Tivissa, Spain
- Serra de la Llena, a mountain range in the Vilanova de Prades area, Spain
- Carena de la Llena, a mountain range in the Alpens area, Spain
- La Llena, a small town in Lladurs municipal territory, Spain
