= Us Against Them =

Studio album by Jake Miller
- Released: November 5, 2013
- Length: 37:16
- Label: Entertainment One
- Producer: Frank Harris (exec.); Jake Miller (exec.); The Fliptones; Tekneek; Tyler Nicolo; Big Jerm; Sayez; The80Two; Roc On Command; Mista Raja

Jake Miller chronology
The Road Less Traveled (2013)	Us Against Them (2013)	Dazed and Confused (2014)

Singles from Us Against Them
- 1. "Collide" Released: September 16, 2013; 2. "A Million Lives" Released: October 15, 2013

Us Against Them is the debut studio album by American rapper Jake Miller. It was released on November 5, 2013, through Entertainment One Music. It debuted and peaked at number 26 on the US Billboard 200.

== Critical reception ==
Gregory Heaney of AllMusic said "While the album would never be accused of being edgy, it has a catchy streak a mile long. Breezy, laid-back, and effervescent, Us Against Them is a rap album built more for summer drives than dancefloor-busting house parties, and its pulsing beats and wistful lyricism make this an album destined for road trip mixes."

== Track listing ==
Standard edition
No.	Title	Writer(s)	Producer(s)	Length
1.	"Collide"	David Delazyn; Jake Miller; Jeremy Thurber; Chaz William	The Fliptones	3:35
2.	"Hollywood"	Delazyn; Miller; Thurber; Tiffany Vartanyan; William	The Fliptones	3:06
3.	"Me and You"	Miller; Dan Wayne	Tekneek	4:08
4.	"High Life" (featuring Jeremy Thurber)	Delazyn; Miller; Thurber; Vartanyan; William	The Fliptones	3:03
5.	"My Couch"	Delazyn; Miller; William	The Fliptones	3:21
6.	"Homeless"	Delazyn; Miller; Vartanyan; William	The Fliptones	3:31
7.	"Carry On"	Miller; Tyler Nicolo	Nicolo	3:20
8.	"Heaven"	Eric Dan; Jeremy Kulousek; Miller	Big Jerm; Sayez	3:28
9.	"A Million Lives"	Delazyn; Miller; William	The Fliptones	3:34
10.	"Puppet"	Miller; Nicolo	Nicolo	3:20
11.	"Number One Rule"	Miller; Nicolo	Nicolo	2:45

iTunes Store bonus tracks
No.	Title	Writer(s)	Producer(s)	Length
12.	"Collide" (Traptain Morgan Remix)	David Delazyn; Jake Miller; Jeremy Thurber; Chaz William	The Fliptones; Traptain Morgan^{[a]}	3:47
13.	"Dead and Gone"	Miller; Nicky Furdal; Jacob Munk Rasmussen	The80Two	3:17

Target bonus tracks
No.	Title	Writer(s)	Producer(s)	Length
12.	"Fly Away" (featuring TAB)	Miller; Kevin Rockhill; Roger Greener	Roc On Command; Mista Raja	3:41
13.	"Suitcase" (featuring Tiffany Vartanyan)	Miller; Vartanyan; Thurber; Williams; Delazyn	The Fliptones	3:32

Notes

- ^{[a]} signifies a remixer.

== Credits and personnel ==
Credits for Us Against Them have been obtained from the album's liner notes.

- Jake Miller - composer, vocals, executive producer
- The Fliptones - composer, producer, recording
- Jeremy Thurber - composer, vocals
- Tekneek - composer, producer
- Tiffany Vartanyan - composer, vocals
- Tyler Nicolo - composer, producer
- Big Jerm - composer, producer
- Sayez - composer, producer
- The80Two - composer, producer
- Traptain Morgan - remixer
- Roc The Command - composer, producer
- Mista Raja - composer, producer
- TAB - vocals
- Marc Karmatz - mixer, recording
- James Royo - mixer, recording
- Robert Vazquez - mixer
- Frank Harris - executive producer, management, A&R
- Natasha Lees - A&R admin
- Marc Stollman - legal
- Chris Gehringer - mastering
- Edgar Esteves - photography

== Charts ==
Chart (2013)	Peak position
US Billboard 200	26
US Independent Albums (Billboard)	3
US Top Rap Albums (Billboard)	5
