= Bayashi =

Japanese YouTuber and TikToker

Instagram information
- Page: bayashi_tv
- Years active: 2019–present
- Followers: 5.9 million

TikTok information
- Page: バヤシ🥑Bayashi
- Years active: 2020–present
- Followers: 54.6 million

YouTube information
- Channel: Bayashi TV
- Years active: 2021–present
- Genres: Cooking; ASMR
- Subscribers: 37.3 million
- Views: 28.7 billion

Hiroaki Nakabayashi (Japanese: 中林宏明; born September 5, 1988) better known as Bayashi or Bayashi TV, is a Japanese YouTuber and TikToker. Known for his short-form mukbang and cooking videos, he has garnered a large following on social media with millions of followers across various platforms. He first joined YouTube in early January 2021 and TikTok in February 2020, uploading cooking tutorials and food ASMR videos on both.

== Career ==
Bayashi has seen a significant amount of virality on social media across multiple platforms. In 2023, he uploaded a video with American food and body influencer Chef Rush, which garnered over 900 million views as of 2026.
