= Hasta Luego =

Single by Hrvy and Malu Trevejo

from the album Can Anybody Hear Me? (unreleased)
- Released: 25 April 2018
- Length: 2:27
- Label: Virgin EMI
- Songwriters: Blair Dreelan; Chaz Mishan; Danny Shah; David Delazyn; Felicity Birt; Harvey Cantwell; Justus Nzeribe; Maria Luisa Trevejo; Nicolas Tevez; Pierre Hachar Jr.

Hrvy singles chronology
"Personal" (2017)	"Hasta Luego" (2018)	"I Wish You Were Here" (2018)

Malu Trevejo singles chronology
"En Mi Mente" (2017)	"Hasta Luego" (2018)	"Nadie Como Yo" (2018)

"Hasta Luego" (English: "See You Later") is a song performed by English singer Hrvy and Cuban-Spanish/American singer Malu Trevejo. The song was released as a digital download on 25 April 2018 by Virgin EMI Records and features on the deluxe edition of his debut studio album Can Anybody Hear Me? The song peaked at number seventy on the UK singles chart. The song was written by Blair Dreelan, Chaz Mishan, Danny Shah, David Delazyn, Felicity Birt, Harvey Cantwell, Justus Nzeribe, Maria Luisa Trevejo, Nicolas Tevez and Pierre Hachar Jr.

== Background ==
Hrvy had been a big fan of Latin music since his writing trips to Mexico. In an interview with the Official Charts Company, he said, "I just wanted to try something different. It’s a collaboration with one of my friends Malu, a Latin-American teen artist who has done some great things in the Latin market, so we thought to cross network and do a Spanish/English song. I’ve been to Mexico and have been writing and recording there, and I just think that the Spanish language sounds super sexy on a song, even if I don’t understand it."

== Music video ==
A music video to accompany the release of "Hasta Luego" was first released on YouTube on 25 April 2018.

== Track listing ==
Digital download
No.	Title	Length
1.	"Hasta Luego"	2:27

Digital download
No.	Title	Length
1.	"Hasta Luego" (Acoustic)	2:11

Digital download
No.	Title	Length
1.	"Hasta Luego" (Sammy Porter Remix)	3:59
2.	"Hasta Luego" (Billy Da Kid Remix)	2:56
3.	"Hasta Luego" (Gaby Music Remix)	2:46
4.	"Hasta Luego" (James Hype Remix)	2:42

== Personnel ==
Credits adapted from Tidal.

- Sky Adams – producer, associated performer, background vocalist, bass (vocal), drums, guitar, keyboards, mixer, programming, recording engineer, studio personnel
- Blair Dreelan – composer, lyricist, mixer, studio personnel
- Chaz Mishan – composer, lyricist
- Danny Shah – composer, lyricist, associated performer, background vocalist, guitar
- David Delazyn – composer, lyricist
- Felicity Birt – composer, lyricist
- Harvey Cantwell – composer, lyricist, associated performer, vocals
- Justus Nzeribe – composer, lyricist
- Maria Luisa Trevejo – composer, lyricist, associated performer, vocals
- Nicolas Tevez – composer, lyricist
- Pierre Hachar Jr. – composer, lyricist
- Dick Beetham – mastering engineer, studio personnel

== Charts ==
Chart performance for "Hasta Luego"
Chart (2018)	Peak position
Scotland Singles (OCC)	13
UK Singles (OCC)	70

== Release history ==
Release history and formats for "Hasta Luego"
Region	Date	Format	Label
United Kingdom	25 April 2018	Digital download; streaming	Virgin EMI Records
