= Luna Llena (song) =

Single by Malu Trevejo
- Language: Spanish; English
- English title: Full Moon
- Released: September 22, 2017
- Genre: Latin pop
- Length: 3:12
- Label: In-Tu Linea; Universal Music Latin
- Songwriters: David Delazyn; Viktoria Hansen; Chaz Mishan; Karen Sotomayor; Omar Tavarez
- Producer: The Fliptones

Malu Trevejo singles chronology
"Luna Llena" (2017)	"En Mi Mente" (2017)

Music video
- "Luna Llena" on YouTube

"Luna Llena" (Spanish for: "Full Moon") is the debut single by Cuban-Spanish singer Malu Trevejo, released through In-Tu Linea and Universal Music Latin. The song was originally scheduled for September 8, 2017, but was delayed until September 22, 2017. On November 17, a version of the song was released with Trevejo singing the verses in English, with the chorus retaining its Spanglish mix.

== Music video ==
The music video for Luna Llena was viewed over 33 million times in the first seven weeks after its release on Vevo and YouTube. The video features appearances by Calum Heaslip.

== Charts ==
Chart (2017)	Peak position
US Hot Latin Songs (Billboard)	18
US Latin Digital Song Sales (Billboard)	8

== Certifications ==
Region	Certification	Certified units/sales
United States (RIAA)	Platinum (Latin)	60,000^{‡}
^{‡} Sales+streaming figures based on certification alone.
