= La Tordue =

French pop band

La Tordue (French for "The Twisted") was a popular musical group from Paris, France that existed from 1989 to 2003.

== History ==
=== Formation and early performances ===
French writer and artist Benoît Morel was working as a designer at publishing house Éditions Gallimard in Paris's Belleville quarter when he met Pierre Payan, a multi-instrumentalist who was in need of lyrics. Morel had already written lyrics for neo-realist group Les Têtes Raides, and discovered that he and Payan shared an interest in 'literary’ music such as the work of Georges Brassens, Léo Ferré's song interpretations of the poetry of Louis Aragon, Les Frères Jacques' performances of the poems of Jacques Prévert, and anarchist singer-songwriter Gaston Couté. The two were soon joined by Eric "Fil" Philippon, and began playing out in October 1990 with the release of a self-financed 10" vinyl EP and as openers for Les Têtes Raides. By 1992 La Tordue were headlining gigs that featured a rotation of many instruments, including concertina, guitar, piano, double bass, musical saw and saucepans.

This versatility of instrumentation allowed the band to play a variety of venues from informal gigs on the street to large festivals, and soon La Tordue found themselves headed on a 400-date tour. In 1993, they opened the Transmusicales rock festival in Morel's hometown of Rennes. The following year they were selected by FAIR (Fonds d'Aide à l'Initiative Rock) and went on to win the Tremplin du Chorus des Halles competition, following this up with the Grand Prix du Sentier des Halles and the Prix du Coup de Cœur Francophone. In June 1994 they performed at the Music Festival of Romania, a month later they were guests at the Francofolies festival in La Rochelle.

=== Recording and later years ===
For five years La Tordue played without releasing an album. Their 1995 debut release, Les Choses de Rien sold 3,000 copies in less than three months without any publicity.

Their second album, 1997's T'es Fou, was awarded the prestigious Académie Charles Cros Grand Prix du Disque. A long tour followed, including a two weeks in Eastern Europe and a three-week stint at L'Européen in Paris.

La Tordue's third album, 2000's Le Vent t'Invite ("The Wind Invites You") broke through with French music fans, establishing the group as one of the most interesting acts on the French Nouvelle Chanson scene. In their first decade as a band, La Tordue had played over 1,000 concerts and sold some 150,000 albums. For the band's tenth anniversary, they released the live album En Vie and embarked on a 40-stop mini-tour with the addition of a fourth member, percussionist Mathieu Morel.

In late 2002, Sony Music released La Tordue's major label debut, Champ Libre ("Open Field"). More slickly produced, the album mixed reggae and ska with La Tordue's more traditionally French chanson style. The album's final track, Le Pétrin, is a protest against France's "double punishment" law that deports immigrants from France after they have served a prison sentence. The track was sung in a dozen foreign languages by numerous artists such as Robert Wyatt, Lo’Jo Triban, Magyd Cherfi of Zebda, Sergent Garcia, Samy Birnbach, Dezoriental, Danyèl Waro, and the Tuvan throat singing of Yat Kha. Their track "René Bouteille" was also included in the 2002 compilation 'Cuisine Non-stop' on David Byrne's Luaka Bop label.

La Tordue disbanded in 2003. Benoît Morel continued his work as an illustrator and went on to record a solo album, Félin pour l’Autre, released in 2007.

== Personnel ==
- Benoît Morel: vocals
- Eric '"Fil" Philippon: Guitar, melodica, bass, xylophone, banjo, toothbrush, vocals
- Pierre Payan: keyboards, guitar, accordion, kalimba, musical saw, melodica, jug, vocals
- Mathieu Morel: drums, percussion

== Discography ==
=== Albums ===
- Les choses de rien (Moby Dick, 1995)
- T'es fou (Moby Dick, 1997)
- Le vent t'invite (M Label, 2000)
- En vie (live album, 2001)
- Champ libre (Epic Records, 2002)

=== Singles and EPs ===
- Le Vent La Mer 10" EP (self-released, 1991)
- "Sur Le Pressoir" b/w "Ton Cul"/"Hasta Luego" CD single (Moby Dick, 1995)
