= Rumors (EP) =

EP by Jake Miller
- Released: July 8, 2015
- Recorded: 2015
- Genre: Pop-rap
- Length: 15:01
- Label: Warner Bros.
- Producers: Brian Lee; Louis Bell; Arthur McArthur; Jon Redwine; Jake Miller; Ian Kirkpatrick; Robopop

Jake Miller chronology
| Dazed and Confused (2014) | Rumors (2015) | Overnight (2016) |

Rumors is the second major label extended play (EP) from American rapper Jake Miller. It was released on July 8, 2015. through Warner Bros. Records without prior announcement or promotion. The EP debuted and peaked at number 119 on the US Billboard 200, and sold 8,000 copies in its first week.

== Critical reception ==
David Jeffires from AllMusic said "With material that's generally light and fluffy in the best sense of the words, rapper Jake Miller tends to shine on the short, EP format, dropping four to six of his infectious pop-rap tracks and then bowing out before he's anywhere near cloying." and went on to say that "[Rumors] is one of his best showcases."

== Music videos ==
Miller released a music video for "Rumors", which was directed by Edgar Esteves, on July 8, 2015. On July 23, 2015, a music video for "Selfish Girls" was released, featuring cameos from Camila Cabello, Jasmine V, Meghan Trainor, and Nikki Flores. Miller released a music video for "Sunshine" on September 9, 2015, as a tribute to his close childhood friend, Dylan Andrew Schopp, who died by suicide on February 12, 2015. A music video for "Yellow Lights" premiered on October 6, 2015.

== Track listing ==
Standard edition
| No. | Title | Writer(s) | Producer(s) | Length |
|---|---|---|---|---|
| 1. | "Rumors" | Carlos Battey; Steven Battey; Louis Bell; Brian Lee; Jake Miller | Lee; Bell | 3:06 |
| 2. | "Shake It" | Autry Dewalt; Brice Fox; James Graves; Brandon Green; Lawrence Horn; Jeremy McArthur; Miller; Andrew Papaleo | McArthur | 2:59 |
| 3. | "Selfish Girls" | Nikki Flores; Nicholas Furlong; Miller; David Quiñones; James-Robert Redwine | Redwine; Miller^{[a]} | 2:48 |
| 4. | "Yellow Lights" | C. Battey; S. Battey; Ian Kirkpatrick; Miller; Sam Watters | Kirkpatrick | 3:08 |
| 5. | "Sunshine" | Clarence Coffee Jr.; Miller; Daniel Omelio | Robopop | 2:56 |

Notes

- ^{[a]} signifies a co-producer.

== Charts ==
| Chart (2015) | Peak position |
|---|---|
| US Billboard 200 | 119 |
| US Top Rap Albums (Billboard) | 7 |
| US Top Album Sales (Billboard) | 55 |
