= The Last Text EP =

EP by Jacob Sartorius
- Released: January 20, 2017
- Genre: teen pop
- Length: 26:52
- Label: T3 Music Group
- Producers: Christopher Rojas; Sanjoy; Mario Marchetti; Russell Ali

Jacob Sartorius chronology
The Last Text EP (2017)	Left Me Hangin' (2017)

Singles from The Last Text EP
- 1. "Sweatshirt" Released: May 3, 2016; 2. "Hit or Miss" Released: July 25, 2016; 3. "All My Friends" Released: October 2, 2016; 4. "Last Text" Released: December 22, 2016; 5. "Bingo" Released: March 31, 2017

The Last Text EP is the debut EP by the American singer Jacob Sartorius, released on January 20, 2017. In 2017, Sartorius embarked on his first tour to promote the EP. "Hit or Miss" was released as the first single on July 25, 2016. A music video for "Bingo" was released on March 31, 2017.

The EP debuted at number 32 on the Billboard 200 and number one on the Independent Albums with 12,000 album equivalent units.

== Track listing ==
The Last Text EP track listing
No.	Title	Length
1.	"Last Text"	3:12
2.	"By Your Side"	3:03
3.	"Bingo"	2:50
4.	"Love Me Back"	3:29
5.	"Jordans"	3:46
6.	"All My Friends"	3:17
7.	"Hit or Miss"	3:57
8.	"Sweatshirt" (remix)	3:18
Total length:		26:52

== Charts ==
Chart performance for The Last Text EP
Chart (2017)	Peak position
Australian Albums (ARIA)	49
Canadian Albums (Billboard)	33
Irish Albums (IRMA)	61
New Zealand Heatseeker Albums (RMNZ)	4
Scottish Albums (Official Charts)	54
US Billboard 200	32
