= Jake Miller (singer) =

American singer (born 1992)

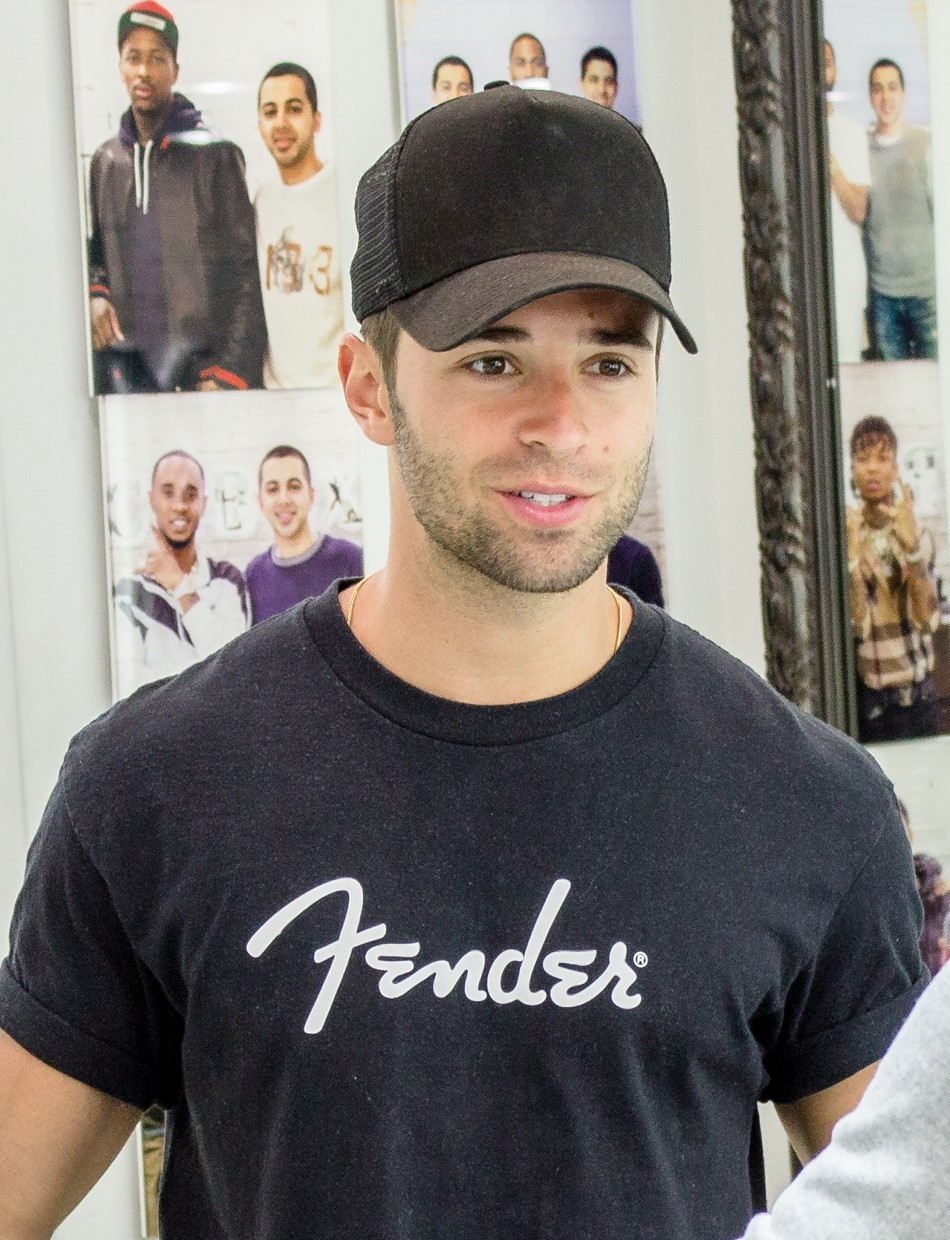
- Miller in 2019

Background information
- Born: Jacob Harris Miller; November 28, 1992 (age 33); Weston, Florida, U.S.
- Genres: Pop-rap; R&B
- Occupation: Singer
- Instrument: Vocals
- Years active: 2011–present
- Labels: Jake Miller Music Inc. / EMPIRE; 88rising (China)
- Website: www.jakemiller.com

Jacob Harris Miller (born November 28, 1992) is an American singer. In 2013, Miller released his debut album Us Against Them. In 2016, Miller's 7-song EP titled Overnight was released. He later released his second album, 2:00am in LA, as an independent artist in 2017, followed by his third album Silver Lining in 2018. In 2019, he released the EP Based on a True Story, which he largely produced in his own bedroom.

== Early life ==
Jake Miller grew up in a Jewish family in Weston, Florida. His father, Bruce Miller, is a pediatric ophthalmologist and played in a band during medical school. He has one sister, Jenny.

== Career ==
=== 2011-2012: Career beginnings and Spotlight EP ===
As a teenager, Miller began making music in his bedroom and posting videos of himself singing to YouTube. On March 11, 2011, Miller performed live for the first time ever, opening for Snoop Dogg at Club Cinema in Pompano Beach, Florida. In May 2011, Miller won the Samsung and T-Mobile USA national "Kick it With the Band" talent competition. As a grand prize winner, Miller was awarded $35,000 to use for his music career as well as a video with YouTube celebrity Keenan Cahill. Afterward he opened for Mac Miller and performed alongside Flo Rida, Sean Kingston, and Asher Roth at the "Think Pink Rocks" concert which benefited breast cancer awareness. In December 2011, Miller performed at the annual Y100 Jingle Ball concert along with Cody Simpson and We the Kings. Miller partnered with Big Time Rush for the song "Lost In Love" from the album 24/Seven. Miller released his EP Spotlight on July 29, 2012, with the single "What I Wouldn't Give".

=== 2013–2015: Us Against Them, early EPs, and Warner Bros. record deal ===
On January 16, 2013, Miller signed with E1 Music. The single "A Million Lives" was released one week later, and was included on the EP The Road Less Traveled, released on April 9 of that year. On May 18, 2013, Miller performed at the Skate and Surf Festival at Six Flags Great Adventure in New Jersey. On November 5, 2013, Miller released his debut full-length album Us Against Them. Later that month, Miller revealed that he had signed a record deal with Warner Bros. Records.

On July 6, 2014, Miller released the lead single from his third EP Dazed and Confused, called "First Flight Home". On November 4, 2014, Miller released the EP, initially titled Lion Heart, then renamed to Dazed and Confused, due this song being more successful on the charts. It marked his debut with Warner Bros. The EP includes the songs "Party in the Penthouse", "Lion Heart", along with the lead single, and features with Nikki Flores on "Ghost" and Travie McCoy on "Dazed and Confused". The songs on the renamed EP are the same from the Lion Heart EP. The accompanying tour, titled The Dazed And Confused Tour, began on July 8, 2015, in Sayreville, New Jersey and went on in the US until August 13, 2015. On the same day of the start of the tour, Miller surprisingly announced through his social medias that an EP, called Rumors, would be released later that day, with five new songs. The EP debuted at No. 118 on the Billboard 200 with 8,000 units, the highest selling new album of the week. The 2015 EP Rumors closes with the track "Sunshine" about Miller's childhood friend Dylan Andrew Schopp who had died by suicide in February 2015 at age 21. A music video was also prepared with proceeds of the single going to the Dylan Schopp Sunshine Foundation and for youth suicide awareness.

=== 2016–2017: Overnight ===
On January 19, 2016, Miller announced that he would be modeling, with representation by Wilhelmina Models. On July 30, 2016, Miller announced his new 7-Track EP titled Overnight would be released on August 19, 2016. The lead single of the same name was released on August 5. On the same day that the EP was released, Miller began touring as an opening act on a portion of the North American leg of Fifth Harmony's The 7/27 Tour. In December 2016 he was chosen as Elvis Duran's "Artist of the Month", and he performed "Overnight" live on NBC's Today show with Kathie Lee and Hoda Kotb.

=== 2017: departure from Warner Bros. Records, 2:00am in LA, and Silver Lining ===
On June 5, 2017, Miller revealed the title, artwork, and the release date for his sophomore album titled 2:00am in LA. Along with the news of the album, he revealed he and Warner Bros. Records had "parted ways". Miller later said that Warner Bros. Records had told him to stop rapping, limited his projects to seven tracks, and that he had felt rushed during studio time. The album was released on June 16, 2017. "Parties", the third song on the album, was the first song that Miller wrote and produced entirely on his own, writing, recording, and producing it in his bedroom studio. The music video for "Parties" features Miller at an actual party that a friend threw for him in order to record the video.

Following his split with Warner Bros. Records, Miller set up a recording studio in his bedroom. On February 19, 2018, Miller announced his third album, Silver Lining. Preorders began on February 20 at midnight, and the first single, "The Girl That's Underneath", was released. The album was released on March 9, 2018, and features a voicemail from his dad as an interlude titled "Headlights". Miller stated that he was influenced by Bruno Mars and LANY while working on the album. In May 2018, Miller released a music video for "Be Alright", which showed Miller visiting patients at Children's Hospital Los Angeles.

=== 2018–2019: Record deal with Red Music and BASED ON A TRUE STORY. ===
On July 27, 2018, Miller announced that he signed a record deal with RED MUSIC, a label division of Sony Music.

On August 2, 2018, Miller was the celebrity guest at the color war breakout at Camp Chen-A-Wanda located in Thompson, Pennsylvania.

On November 16, 2018, Miller released his first major single in five years, "Wait for You", which played on radio stations across the United States. The song debuted at number one on Apple Music's Breaking Pop playlist and charted on Spotify's Global New Music Friday in eight territories. By January 2019, the song had over two million streams. At that time, Miller announced the Wait for You Tour, with twenty-one tour dates scheduled to start after the release of his next extended play in the spring. On March 29, 2019, Miller released the anticipated extended play, BASED ON A TRUE STORY. The Wait For You Tour began on April 11, 2019, in Las Vegas and ended on May 17, 2019, in Los Angeles at the El Rey Theatre. Miller also performed at several summer festivals. On June 1, 2019, Miller performed on the Wango Tango Village Stage, and on June 14, 2019, Miller performed at the BLI Summer Jam.

In September and October 2019, Miller accompanied Hoodie Allen on the Whatever USA Tour as a supporting act. During this time, Miller split his time between Los Angeles and New York City.

=== 2020-2022: Silver Lining II, BASED ON A TRUE STORY II ===
In 2020, during the COVID-19 pandemic lockdown, Miller left his residence in Los Angeles to stay with his parents and sister in Florida. At the time, his sister, Jenny, was recording videos of TikTok dances and posting them to the platform. Miller realized that he could use TikTok to connect with his fans during the lockdown. He wrote and recorded a song, "How Long Will This Last?", and enlisted Jenny and his parents to join him. The song talked about how he had to cancel his plans and ration food due to the pandemic. After the success of the first video, Miller and his family continued to record songs, which they called "Quarantunes", a play on the word "quarantine". Following the videos, Miller gained more than 400,000 new followers on TikTok and his Quarantunes videos received more than 25 million views. During this time, Miller also released his song "ROSS AND RACHEL", based on the fictional relationship between Ross Geller and Rachel Green on the 90s sitcom Friends.

In 2021, Miller released his fourth album, Silver Lining II.

In 2022, Miller released an extended play, BASED ON A TRUE STORY II.

=== 2023-present: Success in China ===
In 2023, Miller embarked on the Note to Self Tour, performing twenty-eight shows in Japan, the Philippines, and the United States. Franklin Jonas opened for Miller at the House of Blues in San Diego on October 15, 2023, the final night of his tour.

Throughout 2023, Miller began to see mainstream success in China after one of his 2015 songs, "Rumors", went viral on Chinese social media. In July 2023, Miller embarked on a tour in China, visiting Shanghai, Beijing, Guangzhou, Guiyang, Chifeng, and Yantai. On December 31, 2023, Miller performed at the Bilibili New Year's Eve Gala in Hangzhou, China. On January 26, 2024, videogame company miHoYo released the music video "White Night" to promote a new update to their game Honkai: Star Rail. Miller provided the vocals for the English version of the song. On April 24, 2024, Miller announced that he had signed a record deal with 88rising in China. In a September 2024 interview with Zach Sang, Miller discussed his success in China and his plans to continue growing his audience there in the future.

== Personal life ==
On June 1, 2024, Miller married his girlfriend of five years, Brandi Burrows, a speech pathologist. A TikTok video of his dad surprising the couple at their reception by performing a parody of the song "Brandy (You're a Fine Girl)" by Looking Glass received more than two million views. He is a fan of the Miami Heat.

In July 2026, Miller and his wife welcomed a baby boy, August James, their first child.

== Discography ==
Studio albums

- Us Against Them (2013)
- 2:00am in LA (2017)
- Silver Lining (2018)
- Silver Lining II (2021)
- BALANCE (2025)

Extended plays

- Summer Session (2011)
- Spotlight (2012)
- The Road Less Traveled (2013)
- Dazed and Confused (2014)
- Rumors (2015)
- Overnight (2016)
- 2:00am in LA (Acoustic) (2017)
- BASED ON A TRUE STORY. (2019)
- SUMMER 19 (2019)
- BASED ON A TRUE STORY II (2022)
- Culdesac (2023)

== Live performances and tours ==
Headlining

- The Miller High Life Tour (2012)
- The Us Against Them Tour (2013)
- The Dazed and Confused Tour (2015)
- The Overnight Tour Europe (2017)
- Back to the Start Tour (2017)
- Hit and Run Tour (2018)
- Wait for You Tour (2019)
- The "Hi, I Missed You" 2021 Tour (2021)
- The 8 Tattoos Tour (2022)
- The Note to Self Tour (2023)
- Balance Tour (2025)

Supporting

- Fifth Harmony – The 7/27 Tour (2016)
- Whatever USA Tour 2019 (with) Hoodie Allen
