= Jacob Sartorius =

American social media personality (born 2002)

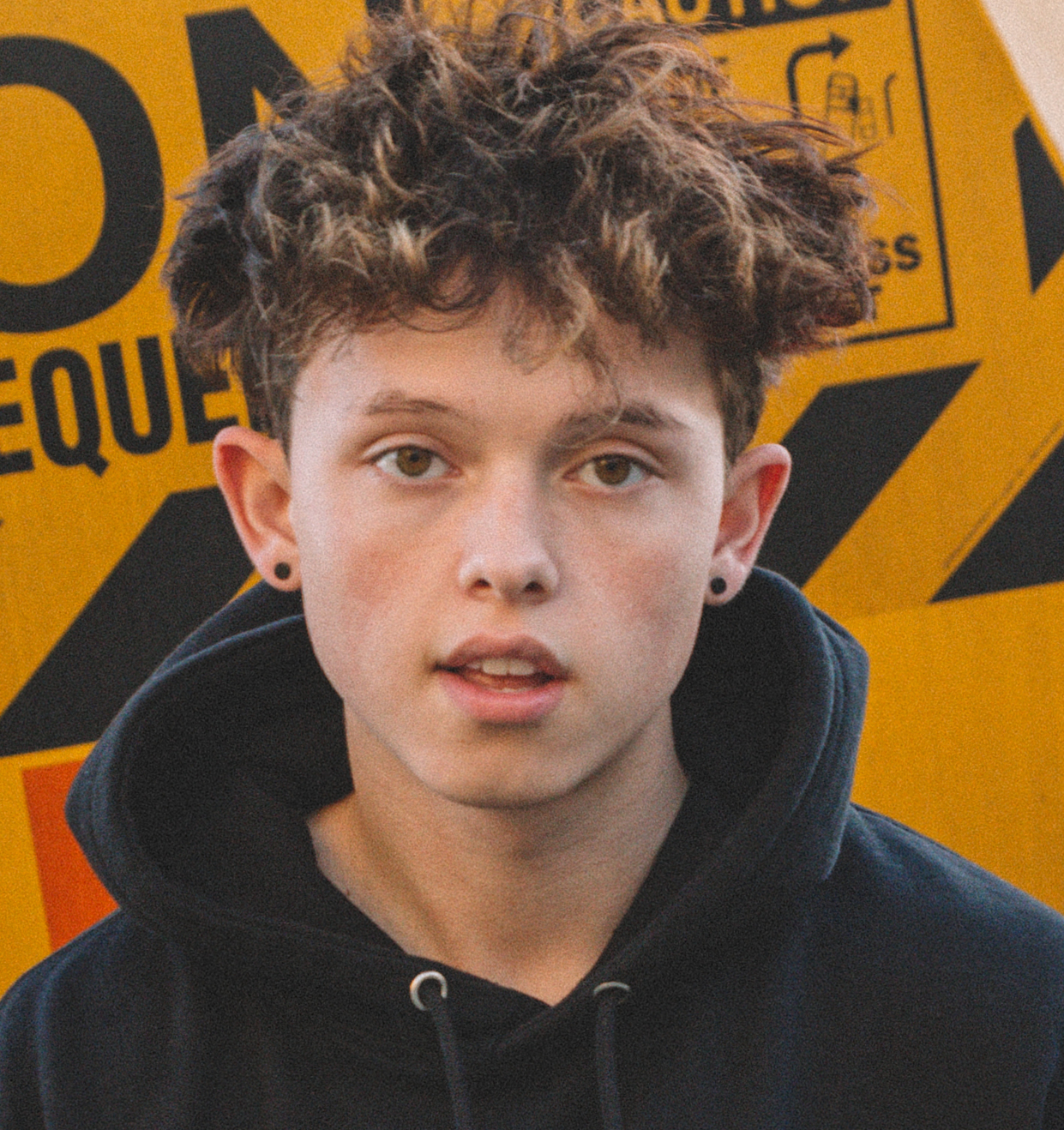
- Sartorius in 2021

Background information
- Born: October 2, 2002 (age 24); Tulsa, Oklahoma, U.S.
- Genre: Pop
- Occupations: Singer; social media personality
- Years active: 2015–present
- Labels: Crazy Cool; T3; RCA (former)
- Website: jacobsartorius.com

Rolf Jacob Sartorius (born October 2, 2002) is an American social media personality and singer. He rose to fame via social media after posting lip-syncing videos on short-form video application Musical.ly. In 2016, he began releasing music with his debut single "Sweatshirt", which, along with his second single "Hit or Miss", charted on the Hot 100 in the United States and in Canada.

== Life and career ==
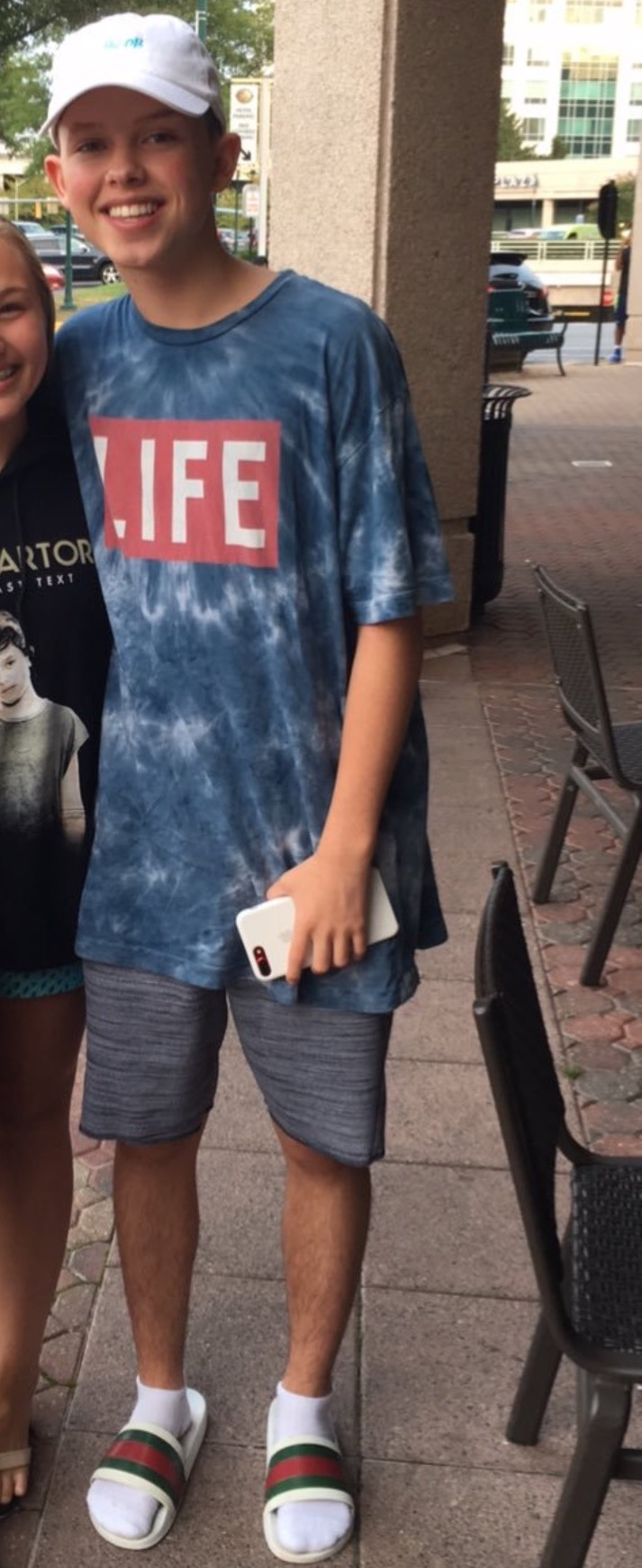
Sartorius in 2017

Sartorius was born on October 2, 2002, in Tulsa, Oklahoma. Shortly after his birth, he was adopted and moved to Virginia because his birth parents were unable to take care of him. He was raised in Reston, Virginia, by his adoptive parents. At age seven, he began acting in musicals, where he discovered his love for performing.

His lip-syncing videos on Vine acquired more than 8 million followers as of August 2016 before Vine shut down in 2017. He said social media offered him an escape from bullying, adding, "Before Musical.ly, I wasn't the most outgoing. The app helped me goof off. It's like no one is watching besides the camera."

In 2018, Sartorius was in a relationship with Millie Bobby Brown.

Sartorius's debut single "Sweatshirt" was released on May 3, 2016, and peaked at No. 90 on the US Billboard Hot 100.

In 2016, he undertook the All My Friends Tour, a solo mini-tour where he performed in six cities. Three months later, he announced The Last Text World Tour, on which he performed in seven countries in 2017 in support of his debut extended play The Last Text, which was released on January 20, 2017. In March 2018, he attended the Los Angeles March for Our Lives protest and spoke at the event. After the tour, he released two more singles, "Hit or Miss" and "All My Friends". "Hit or Miss" debuted at No. 72 in the U.S. and is his highest-charting single to date.

In 2016, Google announced he was the ninth-most-searched musical artist of the year. On November 1, 2018, Sartorius released his EP Better with You.

== Discography ==
=== Extended plays ===
Title	Details	Peak chart positions					
Title	Details	US	AUS	CAN	IRL	NZ Heat.	SCO
The Last Text EP	Released: January 20, 2017; Label: T3 Music Group; Format: Digital download, streaming	32	49	33	61	4	54
Left Me Hangin'	Released: October 6, 2017; Label: RCA; Format: Digital download, streaming	—	—	—	—	—	—
Better with You	Released: 2 November 2018; Label: T3 Music Group; Format: Digital download, streaming	—	—	—	—	—	—
Where Have You Been?	Released: May 31, 2019; Label: Crazy Cool Records; Format: Digital download, streaming	—	—	—	—	—	—
Lost But Found	Released: October 1, 2021; Label: Self-released; Format: Digital download, streaming	—	—	—	—	—	—
Sleep When Im Dead	Released: August 3, 2022; Label: Self-released; Format: Digital download, streaming	—	—	—	—	—	—

=== Singles ===
Title	Year	Peak chart positions		Certifications	Album
Title	Year	US	CAN	Certifications	Album
"Sweatshirt"	2016	90	81	RIAA: Gold	The Last Text EP
"Hit or Miss"	2016	72	76		The Last Text EP
"All My Friends"	2016	—	—		The Last Text EP
"Last Text"	2016	—	—		The Last Text EP
"Bingo"	2017	—	—		The Last Text EP
"Hit Me Back" (featuring Blackbear)	2017	—	—		Left Me Hangin'
"Skateboard"	2017	—	—		Left Me Hangin'
"Chapstick"	2017	—	—		Left Me Hangin'
"Cozy"	2017	—	—		Non-album single
"Up with It"	2018	—	—		Better with You
"Better with You"	2018	—	—		Better with You
"Used To"	2019	—	—		Where Have You Been?
"Party Goes Harder"	2019	—	—		Non-album singles
"Over U"	2020	—	—		Non-album singles
"YouTube & BBQ Chips"	2021	—	—		Non-album singles
"For Real"	2021	—	—		Lost But Found
"Hey, Hello, Goodbye" (featuring Dempsey Hope)	2021	—	—		Lost But Found
"Lifesallgood"	2021	—	—		Lost But Found
"Fly Away"	2021	—	—		Lost But Found
"Fear of Intimacy"	2022	—	—		Sleep When Im Dead
"Worth It"	2022	—	—		Sleep When Im Dead
"Makeup Your Mind"	2022	—	—		Non-album singles
"Planet Lonely"	2022	—	—		Non-album singles
"Temporary Tattoo"	2022	—	—		Non-album singles
"High"	2023	—	—		Non-album singles
"Cowboys"	2023	—	—		Non-album singles
"luv"	2023	—	—		Non-album singles
"—" denotes items which were not released in that country or failed to chart.

=== Promotional singles ===
- "Hang Me Out to Dry" (2017)
- "Popular Girls" (2017)
- "Hooked on a Feeling" (2018)

== Awards and nominations ==
Year	Award	Category	Work	Result
2016	Teen Choice Awards	Choice Muser	Himself	Nominated
2017	iHeart Radio Music Awards	Social Star Award	Himself	Nominated
2017	Kids' Choice Awards	Favorite Viral Music Artist	Himself	Nominated
2017	Radio Disney Music Awards	Favorite Social Media Star	Himself	Nominated
2017	Shorty Awards	Muser of the Year	Himself	Nominated
2017	Teen Choice Awards	Choice Muser	Himself	Nominated

== Tours ==
- All My Friends Tour (2016)
- The Last Text World Tour (2017)
- The Left Me Hangin' Tour (2017)
- Night & Day Tour (opening act for The Vamps) (2018)
