= 95th =

95th is the ordinal form of the number 95. 95th or Ninety-fifth may also refer to:

- A fraction, 1/95, equal to one of 95 equal parts

== Geography ==
- 95th meridian east, a line of longitude
- 95th meridian west, a line of longitude
- 95th Street (disambiguation)

== Military ==
- 95th Brigade (disambiguation)
- 95th Division (disambiguation)
- 95th Regiment (disambiguation)
- 95th Squadron (disambiguation)

== Other ==
- 95th century
- 95th century BC

== See also ==
- April 5, 95th day of the year in a standard year
- 95 (disambiguation)
