= Canceled (song) =

2020 single by Larray

Single by Larray
- Released: October 18, 2020
- Length: 2:52
- Label: Homemade Projects
- Songwriters: Larri Merritt; Danny Snodgrass, Jr.; Henry Nichols; Shawn Young, Jr.; Taymor McIntyre
- Producers: Taz Taylor; Pharaoh Vice; S.Diesel

Music video
- "Canceled" on YouTube

"Canceled" is a song by American YouTuber Larray. It was released on October 18, 2020. The song is a comedic diss track aimed at various social media stars. The song was produced by Taz Taylor, Pharaoh Vice, and S.Diesel.

== Background and composition ==
The majority of the song is backed by a pitch-shifted sample from American rapper Tay-K's "The Race". The song serves as a diss track to many of those mentioned in the song, including Shane Dawson, Tana Mongeau, and the Dolan Twins.

== Music video ==
The music video was released on the same day as the song. It was directed and edited by JakeTheShooter and Larray.

The music video also features other content creators (organized alphabetically):

- Nessa Barrett as herself (student)
- Noah Beck as himself (student)
- Charli D'Amelio as vaper (archive footage)
- Dixie D'Amelio as girlfriend (archive footage)
- Shane Dawson as cat owner (archive footage)
- Ethan Dolan as himself (friend)
- Grayson Dolan as himself (friend)
- Nikita Dragun as herself (student)
- Blake Gray as himself (student)
- Bryce Hall as himself (student) and inmate (archive footage)
- Jxdn as himself (student)
- Lil Huddy as himself (student)
- Griffin Johnson as himself (student)
- Larray as himself
- Tony Lopez as himself (student)
- Tana Mongeau as herself (student)
- Thomas Petrou as himself (student)
- Addison Rae as herself (friend)
- Ravon as schoolmate
- Josh Richards as himself (student)
- Twaimz as himself
- Tati Westbrook as herself (student)
- Jack Wright as himself (student)
- Karen E. Wright as Teacher Julie

== Controversy ==
Roughly a week after the release, Larray addressed backlash he received from the track on TikTok about supposedly "normalizing child grooming", stating:

In the video, I made some jokes and I stated some facts, and there's a huge difference between the two ... I find it ironic that I'm being called out for the Tony Lopez situation, which wasn't a joke, when the entire TikTok community was doing the same thing.

== Chart performance ==
The song reached number 81 on the Billboard Hot 100, making it Larray's first entry on the chart. It also charted at number 34 on the magazine's Hot R&B/Hip-Hop Songs chart and at 96 on the Canadian Hot 100.

== 2023 remix ==
On May 31, 2023, Larray released a remix featuring American musician Twaimz, as well as an accompanying music video. The remix contains a completely different set of lyrics, dissing different people than the original, most notably gaming YouTubers such as Dream, GeorgeNotFound, and TommyInnit, whom both Larray and Twaimz allege to all be homosexual. Kelon Campbell makes an appearance at the end of the video as his internet persona Terri Joe.

== Charts ==
Chart performance for "Canceled"
Chart (2020)	Peak position
Canada (Canadian Hot 100)	96
US Billboard Hot 100	81
US Hot R&B/Hip-Hop Songs	34

== Certifications ==
Certifications for "Canceled"
Region	Certification	Certified units/sales
United States (RIAA)	Gold	500,000^{‡}
^{‡} Sales+streaming figures based on certification alone.
