= Camilla Araujo =

American influencer (born 2002)

- Araujo in 2026
- Born: May 1, 2002 (age 24); Raleigh, North Carolina, US
- Education: East Carolina University
- Occupation: Influencer
- Years active: 2021–present

Instagram information
- Page: camilla araujo
- Years active: 2021–present
- Genres: Vlogging, lifestyle
- Followers: 5.9 million

TikTok information
- Page: Camilla Araujo
- Years active: 2021–present
- Genres: Vlogging, lifestyle
- Followers: 10.9 million

X information
- Handle: @Camilla_ara1
- Display name: Camilla Araujo
- Years active: 2021–present
- Topic: Entertainment
- Followers: 694 thousand

YouTube information
- Channel: Camilla Araujo
- Years active: 2023–present
- Genres: Vlogging, lifestyle, podcasting
- Subscribers: 9.28 million
- Views: 2.99 billion
- Last updated: October 12, 2026
- Website: hoo.be/camillaaraujo

Camilla Araújo (Note: Rendered by herself and most sources as Araujo) (born May 1, 2002) is an American influencer, model, and former OnlyFans creator. She initially garnered prominence in 2021 after appearing in MrBeast's viral Squid Game adaptation on YouTube, after which she established herself as an OnlyFans creator. By the end of 2025, she had amassed a large following on social media and was making upwards of $2.5 million weekly from OnlyFans, before quitting at the start of 2026.

Born to Brazilian American immigrants in North Carolina, Araujo grew up in a working class environment. She enrolled at East Carolina University in Greenville, where she was introduced to and began working for MrBeast, who is based there. She was cast as a contestant in his Squid Game adaptation released in November 2021, gaining widespread attention as a result. After struggling to maintain her career as an influencer, she turned to OnlyFans, where she developed a strategy of rage baiting on social media to draw attention to her content. She was one of the original members of Bop House, a content house for OnlyFans creators that she left in late 2025 amid mounting tensions between the members. By the end of the year, she was making $11 million annually from her work on OnlyFans. In December, she announced she was quitting OnlyFans, but is still active on social media.

As one of OnlyFans' most premier creators during her time active on the platform, Araujo has received extensive coverage for the wealth she has generated from it, as well as her unique manner of promoting herself online. She has claimed to have become a millionaire at 22, and has been noted for her ability to convert her success on OnlyFans into a broader career in fields such as podcasting and fashion. Despite this, she has received criticism for her career on OnlyFans, her manner of generating attention, and allegations of deceptive business practices.

== Early life ==
Camilla Araújo was born on May 1, 2002 to Brazilian immigrant parents in Raleigh, North Carolina. She has stated that she grew up on food stamps in a conservative and religious, working-class environment, with her parents sharing a one-bedroom apartment with four people (including her aunt and uncle) while working "their asses off", describing her home as a "household of love, not money". Her mother worked at a Subway and fish market, while her father at Domino's. Araujo has described her parents as being unprepared to have a child, and at a young age, she taught them English, translated bills, bank letters, and school notices, and went out shopping for them. She claimed that she helped her parents start their own company at age nine.

Araujo graduated in the top 10 of her high school class in 2020, and afterwards enrolled in East Carolina University in Greenville to pursue a nursing program, majoring in biology and with aspirations to become a cardiologist. While in university, she picked up multiple jobs, including modeling, and began to prioritize income over classes. The city of Greenville is the headquarters of social media personality MrBeast's operations, with many students at East Carolina working for him; Araujo later acquired a job for him via a friend who was a videographer for him. Early on, she mostly worked as a personal assistant who assisted with production and provided members with coffee.

After a few months on the job, MrBeast invited Araujo to be featured in his adaptation of the popular South Korean TV series Squid Game. The video was published at the end of November 2021, and garnered massive attention, which trickled towards Araujo. Although she did not win the cash prize, her presence on social media skyrocketed, with her stating that she received 145 thousand followers overnight on TikTok. In a 2025 interview with Taylor Lorenz for Rolling Stone, she stated that she was the only individual to receive substantial online attention from the video, describing her situation as "fate."

== Career ==
=== OnlyFans star (2021–2026) ===
Capitalizing off her success from the Squid Game video, Araujo subsequently dropped out of university, stating that her heart was no longer in it following her newfound attention. However, early on, her success floundered. For a year afterwards, she was active on Instagram, YouTube, and TikTok, posting lifestyle and comedy videos, but these did not translate into major success. Afterwards, she opted to start content creation on OnlyFans in the fall of 2022, leaving her family home for Orlando, Florida. She has stated that it was not an easy decision; she had expressed prior opposition to OnlyFans in the past and was worried about the stigmatization from people back in North Carolina; her parents stopped talking to her for "four or five months".

For a year and half, Araujo worked at a nightclub and for a real estate developer as side-jobs while working on her OnlyFans. After leaving her real estate job with a $30 thousand check, which she alleges was a settlement for workplace sexual harassment, she moved to Fort Lauderdale, alongside her then boyfriend and his friend to form essentially a mini-content house. The trio developed a formula for gaining views based on ragebait. The content was mainly oriented around how many men do not take OnlyFans as a career seriously, with her stating to Taylor Lorenz, "so I would drill that. I would be like, 'I'm a CEO. You're working a nine to five, and if you think it's so easy to make money selling your body, why don't you whip it out and show them how it's done?'" Other tactics included questioning the value of jobs, interviewing her younger brother about how it's like to have an older sister on OnlyFans, or scratching her vagina mid-conversation; this was often done via a faux-podcast format. Some of these clip farming endeavors featured open lies, such as her claiming to have defecated in a jar for $50 thousand.

Araujo frequently employed tactics such as promising access to supposedly uncensored or fully nude content or putting lines such as "i [sic] promise it's (Note: referring to her vulva) pink" to gain subscribers, even if said subscribers would never see the content. She claimed to have become a millionaire by age 22, and in March 2025, she claimed to be making $1.5 million monthly from OnlyFans. Her assistant, Julia Filippo, claimed to have made $54 thousand in a single week in October 2024; controversy erupted online when she claimed that viewers were "sick" since Filippo looked young, leading to accusations of jealousy, though Filippo later stated that she agreed with her assessment. Filippo was a high school friend of Araujo who she invited in early 2024 under the claim of making her a millionaire as an assistant. She claimed to have made $2–2.5 million monthly on OnlyFans in a September 2025 Complex interview.

Araujo was one of the original members of Bop House, a content house for various OnlyFans creators in Miami. Araujo's ragebait tactics have said to have influenced the house's more controversial tactics. She left as she wanted to pursue other things such as fashion, and invested less energy into the group as a result. During her tenure there, tensions mounted between the various creators at Bop House. Rain later left at the end of July 2025, followed by Araujo later in the year over worsening dynamics at the content house, a decision that was formalized despite initial claims from both parties of a possible reunion in August. Filippo later alleged in April 2026 that the drama was a case of Araujo ragebaiting for attention. Despite her departure, controversy still erupted over her presence; in an August 2026 interview with Howie Mandel, a row erupted between the two after Araujo mentioned her collaboration with fellow creator Ari Kytsya and her boyfriend Yung Gravy; her publicist had stated that the Bop House was not to be mentioned and Mandel has mistakenly believed that Kytsya had been a member.

=== Departure from OnlyFans (2026–present) ===
the end of an era 💙
- Camilla Araujo announcing her departure from OnlyFans
- via TikTok
- – Post by Araujo (December 22, 2026)

Despite being an adult content creator, she states that she has never been into it for the love of the industry and more so for the money. Talking to streamer N3on in November 2025, she spoke about how she believes most women on OnlyFans are in a similar situation, saying that many come from a past of trauma. She also still had lingering guilt over her career choice, especially since she was still religious, and also how she could not even see a drop in viewership or earnings without taking a toll on her mood. Speaking to Lorenz in October 2025, she stated that she viewed OnlyFans more so as a stepping stone than a full career. On November 28, 2025, she announced that she had made $11 million on the platform over the past year, and while giving thanks to her fans, noted that she was "kinda over it tho", which was interpreted by many as her indicating that she would be quitting soon.

In a TikTok video released on December 22, she formally announced that she was ceasing to create content on OnlyFans. She clarified that she did not regret it, and that she was not departing any of her other social medias. Over the course of her career on OnlyFans, she claimed that she had made over $20 million. She stated that she had outgrown it and wanted to explore other opportunities and strengthening connections with her viewers. She stated that the transition would be formalized after New Year's Eve, hinting of launching something new "for the girls" at that time.

Becoming Her - Camilla Araujo
- via YouTube
- – Video by Araujo (January 1, 2026)

On New Year's Day 2026, at exactly midnight Eastern Standard Time, she released a documentary "Becoming Her". In it, she explains the story of her life and her career trajectory, and how she wanted to spread the knowledge that she gained becoming an influencer to her fans. The documentary was accompanied by and meant to announce an online course of the same name, which was billed as "[exposing] the viral content formula" that Araujo used to make "millions from [her] phone". Those who are interested are to apply online, upon which her team would review them for inclusion.

While many of her followers applauded her venture, she received extensive backlash online over the course. Individuals who applied for the course alleged that they were being expected to pay upwards of $15 thousand depending on the amount of support and time provided; there were also allegations that the alleged limited pool was fake and complaints over how the material provided could be found elsewhere for free, leading to accusations of the course being a scam and pyramid scheme. Several other influencers, some of whom did OnlyFans also criticized her. Nevertheless, Araujo remained steadfast, proclaiming that she was going to be "the next Kim Kardashian", having previously recreated her 2014 "Break the Internet" photoshoot. Despite this, in February, she admitted that the launch "did not go as expected", but that it had not harmed her momentum.

Since exiting the OnlyFans business, she has devoted her time to teaching others how to become successful influencers, as well as modeling and fashion, with her appearing at New York Fashion Week in September 2026. In 2025, she started a podcast, titled Clock It. Among its episodes was a two-part interview with YouTuber Jack Doherty's former girlfriend, Mckinley Richardson, in October, where she described her relationship with him and alleged abuse; Araujo removed her links to her OnlyFans ahead of the release and demonetized both videos. On August 14, 2026, she announced that the podcast was ending.

== Public profile ==
As one of the premier content creators on OnlyFans, Araujo has been the subject of media coverage regarding the rise of OnlyFans creators in general. A self-described bop, she has been described as having an ability to convert her brand on OnlyFans into more mainstream success. Writing for Rolling Stone, journalist Taylor Lorenz described how Araujo was the most exemplary individual of the post–COVID-19 pandemic rise of OnlyFans, saying Araujo used provocative and polarizing content on other platforms to attract attention. Rebecca Jennings writes at Vulture that some of the tension between Bop House creators stemmed from Araujo's more business-oriented mindset compared to the others.

In November 2025, a viral video showed Araujo being publicly recognized at a bowling alley by two boys described by Us Weekly as no older than 12. The encounter sparked widespread discussion on social media relating to possible exposure of minors to inappropriate content originating on OnlyFans. In response to an Australian anti-pornography activist Melinda Tankard Reist, who had stated that pre-teen boys at a school in Queensland had begun to treat the girls differently due to exposure to Bop House, Araujo declared that she was not promoting anything provocative to the girls, and that if parents care, they can block her content from their children's social media.

== Personal life ==
Araujo is fluent in both Portuguese and English, and knows some Spanish. In Brazil, she set up a local OnlyFans whose proceeds go entirely to her extended family that still live there.

She is in a relationship with fellow influencer Owen Lynch. Lynch helps manage Araujo's multi-million dollar brand. The couple owns around fifteen properties, listed in 2025 as being in Florida, Mississippi, and Ohio, and consisting of Airbnbs and Section 8 housing estates. Lynch came out in early 2026 against Republican candidate James Fishback, who was competing in the Florida Republican primary for that year's gubernatorial election, and had proposed a 50% sin tax on OnlyFans content creators; Lynch stated that he may have to leave Florida if it was implemented. Regarding politics, in the wake of the assassination of Charlie Kirk on September 10, 2025, Araujo criticized individuals who had celebrated his death, stating that it was "heartbreaking" and "disgusting" that people were celebrating the killing of a father and offering condolences to his family, including his wife Erika.

She is a fan of cars, having five as of September 2025. She has received attention for her tendency to dress as other celebrities, including Katy Perry, who she has been said to bear resemblance to.
