= Tim Stokely =

British businessman (born 1983)

Timothy Stokely
- Born: July 1983 (age 43); Harlow, England
- Education: Anglia Ruskin University
- Occupation: Businessman
- Known for: Founder of OnlyFans and CEO until 2021

Timothy Christopher Stokely (born July 1983) is a British businessman, best known as the founder of OnlyFans. After stepping down as CEO in December 2021, Stokely returned to the digital media space in 2025 with the launch of Subs, a creator-focused platform aimed at offering broader monetisation tools across genres.

== Early life ==
Tim Stokely was born in Harlow, Essex, in July 1983, the youngest of four children of Guy Stokely, a retired ex-Barclays investment banker. He has a degree from Anglia Ruskin University.

Stokely's first entrepreneurial venture began while he was still in school, where he collected orders for a local fish and chip shop, charging a markup for delivery.

== Career ==
=== OnlyFans ===
Stokely founded OnlyFans in 2016 with a £10,000 loan from his father, Guy, who told him, "Tim, this is going to be the last one". The platform was designed as a subscription-based service intended for all types of content creators.

According to Stokely, the aim was to monetise existing creator behaviour already present on free social media platforms by introducing a payment mechanism, allowing creators to earn directly from their content.

During its early days, OnlyFans was a family-run business, with Stokely's brother, Tom, as COO and his father as CFO He sought to avoid the mistakes of his earlier sites by building in a referral system that gave third parties an incentive to recruit new content creators to the site. Stokely sold a 75 percent stake in OnlyFans' parent company Fenix International to Leonid Radvinsky in 2018. Following the acquisition, the platform became increasingly associated with adult content and gained widespread attention for its role in the creator economy.

OnlyFans became highly profitable during the COVID-19 pandemic. In July 2020, the platform had grown to 50 million users and 660,000 creators.

In December 2021, Stokely stepped down as CEO of OnlyFans, and was succeeded by Indian-American businesswoman Amrapali Gan. Keily Blair replaced Gan in July 2023.

=== Zoop ===
After leaving OnlyFans, Stokely co-founded Zoop with RJ Phillips in 2022. Zoop is a blockchain-based digital trading card platform that allows fans to collect, buy, sell and trade 3D cards of officially licensed celebrities and influencers. It's backed by, and operates on, the Polygon blockchain network.

In April 2025, Zoop partnered with the Hbar Foundation to submit a late-stage bid to acquire TikTok from ByteDance. The intent to purchase the app, which serves over 170 million US users, was sent to the White House. The bid was framed as a model for creator-owned value generation.

=== Subs.com ===
Stokely launched a new creator platform, Subs.com, in May 2025. Subs is designed as a hybrid of YouTube, Patreon, Cameo and TikTok-style features aimed at overhauling the creator economy. Operating as a web app allows creators to avoid in-app fees from Apple and Google app stores as well as restrictions on adult content. Stokely intended for Subs to offer creators "everything in one place", with features to make audience-building and monetisation easier. The platform is built for a variety of creators, including podcasters, athletes, musicians and adult performers.

=== Other ventures ===
Before OnlyFans, Stokely launched several businesses including the adult performance websites GlamWorship and Customs4U, and a platform that connected users to tradespeople.

In October 2022, Stokely invested in FITFCK, a London-based dating app aimed at fitness enthusiasts. The deal valued the company at £3 million.
