= TikTok Room Awards =

2020 Internet fandom awards show

The TikTok Room Awards was an internet fandom awards show held in 2020. Without affiliation with the TikTok social media platform, it was based through the @tiktokroom Instagram page that had 1.9 million followers, which was disabled by the show's owners according to internet culture journalist Taylor Lorenz. The brand now actively operates under the Instagram handle @tiktokroomtm.

== History ==
The show was founded by Nat and Elasia who met on the internet, a college and high school student at the time respectively. The two originally founded the now defunct Muser Shaderoom in 2016, a media page with nearly 500,000 followers that tracked internet drama related to the social media service Musical.ly, the predecessor to TikTok

In November 2020, the awards show was held online in which fans of social media influencers voted for winners in various categories. Vox reported that nearly 500,000 votes were cast via a Google Form for the show. The show featured and was promoted by several internet influencers, such as Charli D'Amelio, Dixie D'Amelio, James Charles, and Noah Beck.

== Winners ==
Award	Winner
Best house	Sway Boys
Best style (female)	Avani Gregg
Best style (male)	Huddy
Best YouTuber	Larray
Best song	Jaden Hossler's Angels and Demons
Most positive	Sienna Gomez
Most active with fans	Charli D'Amelio
Best makeup	James Charles
Best fandom	Sienna Gomez
Best group/duo	4freakshow
Best diss track	Larray's Cancelled
Best hair	Devyn Winkler
Best clapbacks/comebacks	James Charles
Best dance creator	Haley Sharpe
Most talented musician	Jaden Hossler
Kindest TikToker	Sienna Gomez
Best role model	Sienna Gomez
Most achieved (female)	Charli D'Amelio
Most achieved (male)	James Charles
Least problematic (female)	Sienna Gomez
Least problematic (male)	Jack Wright
Best dancer (female)	Charli D'Amelio
Best dancer (male)	Jack Wright and James Wright
Funniest TikToker	Larray
Best ship	Sienna Gomez and Jack Wright
Best couple	Dixie D'Amelio and Noah Beck
Favorite Influencer (female)	Sienna Gomez
Favorite TikToker (male)	Vinnie Hacker
