= 95 =

95 or 95th may refer to:

- 95 (number), the natural number following 94 and preceding 96
- one of the years 95 BC, AD 95, 1995, 2095, etc.
- 95th Division (disambiguation)
- 95th Regiment
- 95th Regiment of Foot (disambiguation)
- 95th Squadron (disambiguation)
- Atomic number 95: americium
- Interstate 95, the main north–south Interstate Highway on the East Coast of the United States
- Microsoft Office 95, a major release of Microsoft Office
- Saab 95, a station wagon
- Windows 95, a consumer-oriented operating system
- 95 Arethusa, a main-belt asteroid

== See also ==
- 9 to 5 (disambiguation)
- 95th (disambiguation)
- List of highways numbered 95
