= Piper Rockelle =

American content creator and model (born 2007)

- Rockelle in 2023
- Born: Piper Rockelle Smith; August 21, 2007 (age 19); Canton, Georgia, U.S.
- Occupations: Content creator; model; singer
- Years active: 2017–present
- Musical career
- Genres: Pop; dance; hip-hop
- Instrument: Vocals
- Website: piperrockelle.com

Piper Rockelle Smith (born August 21, 2007) is an American content creator, model, singer and social media personality. Between 2017 and 2020, she made content with "Piper's Squad", a group of content creators; a subsequent lawsuit by its members against her mother was portrayed in the 2025 Netflix series Bad Influence: The Dark Side of Kidfluencing. She has also filmed content with the Bop House. In 2025, she transitioned to the adult entertainment industry.

== Early life ==
Piper Rockelle Smith was born in Canton, Georgia on August 21, 2007. Her father left before she was born and her mother Tiffany Smith owned a pet grooming business and homeschooled her. Rockelle's mother began entering her in to beauty pageants aged three and posting her on social media and using her to make content when she was aged eight. Her earliest content was uploaded to TikTok, then known as Musical.ly. Within a few years, she had filmed for the Lifetime YouTube series Dance Twins and created accounts on YouTube and Instagram. Her mother managed all her social media accounts.

== Career ==
=== 2017–2024: Beginnings and breakthrough ===
Rockelle with a parrot, 2018

At the age of ten, Rockelle appeared in Mani, a web series she later left at her mother's behest, as she objected to Rockelle receiving fewer lines than another actress. The pair later moved to Los Angeles for Rockelle's career. Around this time, Tiffany began dating video editor Hunter Hill, who was erroneously introduced in Rockelle's content as her older brother. Between then and 2020, Rockelle had a group of friends who called themselves "Piper's Squad" and regularly appeared in her content; frequent guests included Elliana Walmsley and Jenna Davis. The group's output included viral challenges, dances, pranks, and dating content including kissing. Rockelle also released music including the 2019 single "Treat Myself" and acted in the web series Chicken Girls.

By January 2022, Rockelle was earning between $4.2 and $7.5 million per year. That same year, 11 families of Squad members sued Tiffany and Hill for abuse, following which YouTube demonetized Rockelle's account. The lawsuit was settled outside of court in 2024 for $1.85 million, which was split among the 11 plaintiffs. A documentary series titled Bad Influence: The Dark Side of Kidfluencing was released by Netflix in April 2025. Rockelle uploaded her final video to YouTube before Christmas 2024.

=== 2025–present: Transition to adult entertainment ===
By February 2025, she had filmed TikTok videos with the Bop House, a collective of OnlyFans creators founded by Sophie Rain that Rockelle subsequently joined in December. By May 2025, she had opened accounts on both BrandArmy, an OnlyFansesque subscriber-based social medium that did not allow nude content, and on Snapchat. People reported that month that her BrandArmy account was labeled as "parent managed" and that subscribers to the highest tier could request "custom looks".

Just before her 18th birthday, she began posting about opening an OnlyFans account of her own, following Lil Tay launching an account on her 18th. She opened the account on January 1, 2026, and promoted it with an Instagram video featuring her grandmother. She subsequently claimed to have made from the site $1 million in less than an hour and nearly $3 million on her first day, though both tweets were subsequently deleted. Following backlash, she stated that "the real gross one[s]" were those behind the demand for her content, that she had delayed joining the site to keep open the possibility of acting professionally, and that she joined the site after finding that her past was obstructing her from doing so. The following month, Rockelle was the subject of a Nightline episode in which she discussed her career with Juju Chang. The Independent reported shortly after launch that her OnlyFans bio promised that she would "take it all off"; however, when asked on her Nightline episode, she stated that she had not yet begun posting nudity.

== Personal life ==
At 17 years old, she began dating Capri Jones after hiring him to play her boyfriend and realizing they liked each other; he began appearing regularly in her content in March 2025. By January 2026, she had begun dating Syracuse-based Twitch streamer 2xrakai, with whom she went official at Super Bowl LX. As of April 2026, she was dating fellow YouTube child star Gavin Magnus.

== Discography ==
Singles
Year	Title	Featured artists	Album
2018	"It's Christmas"		Non-album singles
2019	"Treat Myself"		Non-album singles
2020	"Sidewalk"		Non-album singles
2021	"Butterflies"		Non-album singles
2021	"Yesterday"		Non-album singles
2022	"Tea Party"		Non-album singles
2023	"Bittersweet 16"		Non-album singles
2023	"Sidewalk 2"	loljulia	Non-album singles
2024	"Perfect 10"		Non-album singles
2025	"Give Me a Reason"	Capri	Non-album singles

== Awards and nominations ==
Year	Award	Category	Result	Ref.
2020	iHeartRadio Music Awards	Social Star Award	Nominated	
