= One Whole Day =

2020 single by Dixie D'Amelio

Single by Dixie D'Amelio featuring Wiz Khalifa
- Released: December 4, 2020
- Recorded: 2020
- Genre: Pop-trap
- Length: 3:00
- Label: Hitco
- Songwriters: Andrew Goldstein; Brooke Tomlinson; Lindy Robbins; Cameron Thomaz
- Producer: Andrew Goldstein

Dixie D'Amelio singles chronology
"Naughty List" (2020)	"One Whole Day" (2020)	"Roommates" (2020)

Wiz Khalifa singles chronology
"The Thrill" (2020)	"One Whole Day" (2020)	"Cheers" (2020)

Music video
- "One Whole Day" on YouTube

"One Whole Day" is a song by American social media personality and singer Dixie D'Amelio featuring American rapper Wiz Khalifa. The song and music video were released on December 4, 2020. It was produced by Andrew Goldstein.

== Background and composition ==
The song and music video were released on December 4, 2020. The pop-trap song is about love, heartbreak, and triumphing after a breakup. D'Amelio did not confirm speculation that the song is about her breakup with social media personality Griffin Johnson. The music video features her boyfriend, Noah Beck, and her younger sister, Charli D'Amelio. The song and music video are noticeably darker than D'Amelio's debut single, "Be Happy" (2020).

== Critical reception ==
The song was met with negative reviews from music critics. The Dallas Observer wrote that "D'Amelio uses grating electronic beats and tired, kindergarten grade rhymes to sing about the same kind of angry heartbreak that's been sung about since the days of the Dust Bowl." It was included on a list of the worst songs of 2020 published by Insider, writing that it "sounds like a parody of a real song." It was additionally compared to Rebecca Black's "Friday"; however, the publication added that "except it's not nearly as catchy".

== Credits and personnel ==
Credits adapted from Tidal.

- Andrew Goldstein – producer, composer, bass, guitar, mixer, programming and keyboards
- Brooke Tomlinson – composer, vocals
- Lindy Robbins – composer
- Wiz Khalifa – composer, featured artist,
- Cate Wright – A&R administration and direction,
- Marie Lewis – A&R coordination
- Brian Gardner – mastering
- Mitch Allan – mixer, vocal production
- Caleb Hulin – vocal engineer

== Charts ==
Chart performance for "One Whole Day"
Chart (2020)	Peak position
New Zealand Hot Singles (RMNZ)	8
