= Hype House (TV series) =

American reality television series

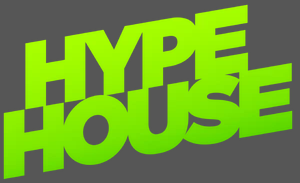
- Genre: Reality
- Based on: The Hype House
- Starring: Chase Hudson; Nikita Dragun; Thomas Petrou; Larri Merritt; Mia Hayward; Alex Warren; Jack Wright; Kouvr Annon; Vinnie Hacker; Jacob Day
- Country of origin: United States
- Original language: English
- No. of seasons: 1
- No. of episodes: 8

Production
- Executive producers: Kit Gordon; Deanna Markoff; Luke Neslage; Will Nothacker; Eric Wattenberg
- Editor: Mac Caudill
- Production companies: Wheelhouse Entertainment; Spoke Studios

Original release
- Network: Netflix
- Release: January 7, 2022

Hype House is an American reality television series, released on Netflix on January 7, 2022. The show follows the lives of each member of the Hype House, a group of content creators who make videos for the social media application TikTok.

== Cast ==
- Chase Hudson
- Nikita Dragun
- Thomas Petrou
- Larri Merritt (Larray)
- Mia Hayward
- Alex Warren
- Jack Wright
- Kouvr Annon
- Vinnie Hacker

== Background ==
The Hype House is a Los Angeles–based group of content creators, who live in the same home and post videos to TikTok and YouTube respectively. The settlement was founded by Thomas Petrou, Daisy Keech, Alex Warren, Chase Hudson. Several TikTok creators with large followings were members of the group, including Charli D'Amelio, Dixie D'Amelio, and Addison Rae.

== Episodes ==
No.	Title	Original release date
1	"A Hype House Divided"	January 7, 2022
2	"Love and Social Media"	January 7, 2022
3	"Low-key Beefing"	January 7, 2022
4	"POV: Fake Wedding"	January 7, 2022
5	"Alex and the Terrible, Horrible, No Good, Very Bad Week"	January 7, 2022
6	"Clique Bait"	January 7, 2022
7	"Friendship Goals"	January 7, 2022
8	"Glow Up"	January 7, 2022

== Reception ==
Reception of the show by the general public was negative, with a Change.org petition to cancel the show attracting 1,400 signatures.

Critics were mostly negative. Stephanie McNeal wrote for BuzzFeed News that the show managed to "somehow make being young, rich, and famous in Los Angeles seem horribly depressing." She also wrote that the stars, despite their popularity, were ultimately very boring and unmemorable to watch (with the exception of Larray and Nikita Dragun) and the show itself was "certainly an interesting insight into the machinations of content houses and the struggles that come with them, but it is not a very fun or interesting show."

Allyson Weissman, writing for the student newspaper The Daily Bruin, gave it 2 out of 5 stars, calling the series "uneventful and lifeless".

Madeline Roth of The Daily Beast in a negative review called the show "mind-numbing" and that Larray and Nikita Dragun were "the two saving graces of Hype House".
