= Hype (marketing) =

Intensified publicity strategies to drive demand

Hype in marketing is a strategy of using extreme publicity. Hype as a modern marketing strategy is closely associated with social media.

Marketing through hype often uses artificial scarcity to induce demand. Consumers of hyped products often participate as a form of conspicuous consumption to signify characteristics about themselves.

Hype allows brands to promote their image above the actual quality of the product. Streetwear brands have collaborated with luxury fashion to justify charging premium prices for their goods. As an example, fashion label Vetements used social media channels to promote a limited-edition hoodie which sold 500 units in hours, recording sales of €445,000.

When hype marketing is used to drive demand for limited-edition goods, consumers sometimes attempt resell those good on secondary markets for a profit (comparable to ticket scalping). The resale market is a $24 billion industry.

== Method ==
Luxury brands may release products as a collaborate with ready-made garment brands as a way to build hype. Collaborations have been used by some luxury brands to circumvent fast fashion brands copying their designs.

NYU Professor Adam Alter says that for an established brand to create a scarcity frenzy, they need to release a limited number of different products, frequently.

Hype is often built via Pop-up retail. Comme des Garçons was one of the first to use this strategy, leasing a short-term vacant shop solved the storage problems of releasing product for quick sale.

Hype campaigns also rely on influencer marketing, where brands enlist creators whose parasocial relationships with their followers help convert audience attention into demand for limited releases.

== In popular culture ==
The term 'hypebeast' has been coined to define consumers vulnerable to hype marketing. The origins of the term come from the Hong Kong-based company Hypebeast. The behaviours of the hypebeast define hype marketing; the purchase of popular goods they can't afford to impress others. Hype also manifests itself in queues with brands often retailing hyped products through pop-up stores.

Many luxury brands release hyped products via their online shop. This has led to the creation of companies that allow consumers to use bots to guarantee or improve their chances of purchasing a limited-edition product.

== See also ==
- Content house
- Content marketing
- Creator economy
- Gartner hype cycle
- Influencer marketing
- Social commerce
- Social media marketing
