= Content house =

Residence used by internet celebrities for content creation

A content house, or also known as a collab house, creator house, content collective, influencer house or influencer group, is a residential property which is most commonly used by internet celebrities, social media influencers or content creators in order to provide a focus on creating content for social media platforms, such as YouTube, TikTok, and Instagram.

Content houses are intended to provide a fertile ground for influencers to help provide content for their viewers, in addition to helping grow their profile and brand through collaborations with other members of the house. They are most associated with the users of TikTok, a video-sharing social networking service; and have been referred to as "TikTok houses".

== History ==
An early example of a content house was first seen in the 1999 reality television show Big Brother, and the franchise that the show inspired. Contestants lived together in a home specifically designed to be isolated from the outside world, and the drama of the series derived from the interactions between its "housemates". The first social media content houses were created in 2012, with some of the earliest formed by YouTuber Connor Franta for the YouTube channel Our Second Life and The Creature House. Notable content houses include the former Team 10 house inhabited by Jake Paul, the FaZe House, the Hype House, the Sway House.

The origins of collab houses date back to 2014 when the members of Our Second Life lived and created content in their 02L Mansion. In 2015 popular users of Vine occupied an apartment at 1600 Vine Street in Los Angeles.

The proximity of fellow content creators and the availability of emotional support from their peers have contributed to the popularity of collab houses. Abundance of natural light and privacy from fans and neighbors are important considerations for such buildings.

Barrett Swanson, in Harper's Magazine, described collab houses as "grotesquely lavish abodes where teens and early twenty somethings live and work together, trying to achieve viral fame on a variety of media platforms" and attributed their rise in popularity to the COVID-19 pandemic when they "began to proliferate in impressive if not mind-boggling numbers, to the point where it became difficult for a casual observer even to keep track of them". Swanson stayed at the Clubhouse For the Boys in Los Angeles and felt that the management of the clubhouse "actually care[d] very little about the long-term fates of these kids. After all, there's a fungible supply of well-complected youngsters constantly streaming into Los Angeles. Only a very small percentage of these kids will actually make it in the industry; the rest of them, Amir [Ben-Yohanan] tells me, will eventually just "cycle through".

The Clubhouse For the Boys in Los Angeles was based in a 7,000 sq ft (650 m^{2}) house valued at $8 million. The occupants of the house were expected to post three to five videos a week to social media accounts linked to the Clubhouse in exchange for free room and board. The house was owned by external investors who took up to 20% of the earnings of the occupants.

The house had House Rules listed on a whiteboard, which included exhortations to refrain from drinking alcohol between Sunday and Thursday and to "finish brand deliverables before inviting guests".

The popularity of collab houses arose at the same time as the burgeoning COVID-19 pandemic in the United States. Swanson felt that several articles in The New York Times about the collab houses had characterized their residents as "incorrigible Dionysians" as a result of the disparity between their lifestyle and the demands of the public health emergency.

A January 2020 article in The New York Times described Los Angeles as "home to a land rush" of collab houses. Hype House, a collective of content creators was set in a 'Spanish-style mansion perched at the top of a hill on a gated street' with a 'a palatial backyard, a pool and enormous kitchen, dining and living quarters' and was home to four members of the group.

Hype House was formed in December 2019, TikTok videos tagged #hypehouse had accrued 100 million views by January 2020.

On 22 April 2021, Netflix announced that it was in production of a reality television series entitled Hype House, which is set at the content house of the same name. Hype House is set to star various content creators such as Nikita Dragun, Lil Huddy (also known as Chase Hudson), and Thomas Petrou. Reception to the announcement on social media was mostly negative, with some Netflix subscribers threatening to cancel their subscriptions if the series was aired.

== List of content houses ==
France

- Bro House
- French House

Philippines

- House of Collab
- Neuto House Philippines

UK

- Byte House / Byte Squad
- The Council House
- Icon House
- Wave House

USA

- 1600 Vine Street (2015)
- Alpha House
- Alt House
- Bay House
- Bop House
- Cabin Six
- Clubhouse BH (Beverly Hills)
- Clubhouse FTB (For The Boys)
- Clubhouse Next (formerly the Click House)
- Collab Crib
- The Diomi House
- Diversity University
- Drip Crib
- Drip House
- FaZe House
- Fenty Beauty House
- Girls in the Valley
- The Glam House Beverly Hills
- House Of Talent
- Hype House (2019)
- Kids Next Door
- Melanin Mansion
- Myth Crib
- Not a Content House
- OL2 Mansion (2014)
- Paseo (in Austin, Texas)
- Shluv House
- Sway House (2020)
- V@ult House
- Vibe Crew L.A.
- Vibe House
- Young Finesse Kids

=== YouTuber mansions ===
- The Vlog Squad house in Studio City
- Jake Paul's Team 10 House in West Hollywood and Calabasas
- The Clout House in the Hollywood Hills
