= C95 =

C95 or variation, may refer to:

- ECO code for Ruy Lopez, Breyer Variation chess openings
- ICD-10 code for Leukaemia of unspecified cell type
- a branding name for Canadian radio CFMC-FM
- Protection of Wages Convention, 1949, a conference by International Labour Organization
- ANSI C95, officially ANSI C Amendment 1 or ISO/IEC 9899/AMD1:1995, a past version of the C programming language standard
- Honda C95 Benly motorcycle
- C-95 Grasshopper, a 1941 American military cargo aircraft
- Embraer C-95 Bandeirante, a Brazilian military transport aircraft
- 95th Comiket

== See also ==
- 95 (disambiguation)
- C (disambiguation)
