= Larray =

American YouTuber (born 1998)

- Meritt in 2022
- Born: Larri Lajon Merritt; July 22, 1998 (age 28); Compton, California, U.S.
- Education: Alta Loma High School
- Occupation: Content creator

Instagram information
- Page: larray
- Followers: 6.4 million (March 7, 2026)

TikTok information
- Page: larrayissexyashell
- Followers: 27.8 million

YouTube information
- Channel: LARRAY
- Years active: 2015 – present
- Subscribers: 10 million
- Views: 1.2 billion

Larri Lajon Merritt (born July 22, 1998), professionally known as Larray, is an American media personality and YouTuber. He produces comedic video content on his YouTube channel, and was part of the collaborative TikTok collective known as The Hype House. After initially gaining prominence on Vine, he started uploading videos onto YouTube after the former became defunct.

== Career ==
Before becoming a member of The Hype House in January 2020 to late 2020, he had accumulated over 6 million subscribers on his personal YouTube channel, in addition to approximately 12.8 million followers on his personal TikTok account. He was nominated in the Breakout Creator category at the 9th Streamy Awards in December 2019. His three novelty songs "First Place", "Last Place" and "Canceled" together spent 42 weeks on Billboard's Comedy Digital Tracks chart before its abolishment in January 2020, with the former gaining over 41 million views on YouTube, and ranking at number 13 on the 2018 year-end chart.

Merritt is openly gay. In August 2022, he launched a virtual restaurant that sells mac and cheese.

== COVID-19 pandemic controversy ==
On July 21, 2020, Nikita Dragun held a surprise birthday party for Merritt during the COVID-19 pandemic. The party included social media personalities such as James Charles, Charli D'Amelio, Dixie D'Amelio, and others. At the time of the party, California's COVID-19 cases had just surpassed New York's cases. There was an estimated 67 people in attendance, many of whom were seen without face masks despite local health recommendations. Photos and videos of the event appeared on social media sites such as Instagram. These posts drew criticism from the public, including other influencers like Elijah Daniel and Tyler Oakley. Merritt, and some of the other attendees, later apologized. Residents of the Hype House later tested negative for COVID-19.

== Discography ==
=== Singles ===
Title	Year	Peak chart positions		Certification	Album
Title	Year	US	CAN	Certification	Album
"Canceled"	2020	81	96	RIAA: Gold	Non-album single
"Canceled (Remix)" (featuring Twaimz)	2023	—	—		Non-album single
"—" denotes a song that did not chart or was not released in that territory.

=== Other charted songs ===
Title	Year	Peak chart positions	Album
Title	Year	US Comedy	Album
"First Place"	2018	4	non-album singles
"Last Place" (featuring Twaimz)	2018	8	non-album singles

== Awards and nominations ==
Year	Award	Category	Result	Ref(s)
2019	Streamy Awards	Breakout Creator	Nominated	
2020	Streamy Awards	Creator of the Year	Nominated	
2020	Streamy Awards	First Person	Nominated	
2020	Streamy Awards	Lifestyle	Won	
