= Olivia Ponton =

American model

- Born: May 30, 2002 (age 23); Naples, Florida, U.S.

Instagram information
- Page: OLIVIA PONTON
- Followers: 2.8 million

TikTok information
- Page: olivia ponton
- Followers: 7.5 million

YouTube information
- Channel: Olivia Ponton
- Subscribers: 143 thousand
- Views: 3.88 million
- Modeling information
- Height: 5 ft 9 in (175 cm)
- Agency: IMG Models
- Last updated: February 6, 2025

Olivia Ponton (born May 30, 2002) is an American model and social media influencer. She first became active on TikTok during the COVID-19 pandemic. As a model, she is represented by IMG Models and has appeared in the Sports Illustrated Swimsuit issue.

== Early life and career ==
Ponton was born in Naples, Florida on May 30, 2002. Her mother, Diane, works for an education non-profit, and her father, Richard, is a teacher.

Ponton attended Naples High School where she participated in cheerleading and track and field. During her senior year of high school, Ponton traveled to New York City for her spring break and signed with Wilhelmina Models. After graduating high school in 2020, Ponton began posting workout videos to TikTok out of boredom during the COVID-19 pandemic. She later signed with IMG Models and has appeared in campaigns for Coach New York, Skims, Calvin Klein, and Hugo Boss.

Ponton was photographed in Montenegro for the 2022 Sports Illustrated Swimsuit edition and Dominica for the 2023 edition. Ponton made a cameo appearance in the 2024 film It Ends with Us. On October 27, 2025, Ponton released the first episode of her literature-focused podcast, Booked & Busy.

== Personal life ==
Ponton lived in The Hype House for approximately three months in 2020. In a June 2021 interview with Teen Vogue, Ponton publicly came out as bisexual and revealed she was dating Canadian soccer player Kaila Novak. The couple ended their relationship a few months after the announcement. Ponton credited JoJo Siwa as her inspiration to publicly come out. In 2022, she announced that she is pansexual.

In December 2024, Ponton reported a burglary at Joe Burrow's home in Anderson Township, Ohio. In the police report filed by the Hamilton County Sheriff's Office, Ponton was listed as an employee of Burrow, who was out of state for an away game against the Dallas Cowboys. She first called her mother, Diane, who called 911 on her behalf.
