= Bop House =

Content creator collective in Florida

- Formation: December 8, 2024
- Founder: Sophie Rain; Aishah Sofey
- Founded at: Fort Lauderdale, Florida, United States
- Purpose: Entertainment
- Origins: TikTok, OnlyFans

Bop House is a content creator collective launched in December 2024 by Sophie Rain and Aishah Sofey. The group consists of eight OnlyFans creators living together in a mansion in Florida. In mid-2025, personnel changes included the departure of Rain.

== History ==
The Instagram account @BopHouse launched on December 8, 2024, with a video featuring Sophie Rain and Aishah Sofey. Over the following days, additional members were introduced, including Summer Iris, Alina Rose, Joy Mei, Ava Reyes, Camilla Araújo, and Julia Filippo. At launch, members were aged between 19 and 24. The term bop is slang for a woman or girl considered promiscuous or overly sexualized; on social media, it is often used as an abbreviation for "baddie on point" and can refer to sex workers. OnlyFans creators such as Rain and Araújo have adopted the term as a form of empowerment. Within one month, the Bop House TikTok account had over 1.3 million followers, while its members collectively exceeded 33 million followers across social media platforms.

In February 2025, the group invited influencer Piper Rockelle to the house prior to her 18th birthday. The collaboration drew backlash online; Rockelle said she was only collaborating with the group and was not joining the collective. The Bop House initially spent three months at a property in Fort Lauderdale, Florida, during which time members reported incidents of swatting, break-ins, vandalism, and individuals docking boats nearby. Their subsequent Fort Lauderdale location was broken into by a man who claimed to be Rain's fiancé and later pleaded no contest to charges of unarmed burglary, resisting arrest, and using a false name. The Bop House later relocated to a penthouse in Brickell, Miami, described by Vulture as "a $100,000-per-month rental with three stories".

Tensions emerged in mid-2025; at the end of July, co-founder Sophie Rain announced her departure, citing conflicts with Camilla Araújo and stating the group had become "controlling". Weeks later, Araújo also exited, calling it a personal decision to pursue new projects. The collective subsequently held an online contest to recruit a new member, selecting Mexican OnlyFans model Lexi Marvel from 12,000 applicants.

== Content and activities ==
The Bop House is a content creator collective in which female influencers share a residence to produce collaborative social media content. Some members have established online followings, while others are emerging creators. They primarily post on TikTok and Instagram and share expenses, including a reported US$75,000 monthly rent (in Fort Lauderdale), converting the house into a continuous production space. The group's stated goal is to maintain a steady flow of content to sustain engagement and promote their OnlyFans accounts, which is their primary income source. Members do not create explicit pornography for OnlyFans.

The Bop House follows a model similar to earlier influencer collectives such as The Hype House and Jake Paul's Team 10, but consists exclusively of OnlyFans creators and emphasizes adult-oriented content. Unlike traditional influencer houses, the collective focuses on intimacy positioned between explicit adult content and a girlfriend experience. Members monetize content through OnlyFans subscriptions, keeping revenue within the group. Bop House's social media accounts do not mention OnlyFans directly. Instead, links in their bios lead to intermediary sites that list each creator's OnlyFans profile, placing the explicit content two clicks away from Meta-owned platforms.

Bop House videos include choreographed dances, matching outfits, pranks, and rage bait; members have acknowledged staging certain scenarios, including claims of interpersonal conflict, theft, and pregnancy rumors. The Bop House has been compared to the Playboy Mansion, with Kyle Philippi of Vice calling it "a modern-day, TikTokified Playboy Mansion full of OnlyFans models" and Stephanie Ganz of Parents referring to it as a "Gen-Z Playboy Mansion." Its success has led to the emergence of similar collectives, including Creator House and Rebel House, which also feature OnlyFans creators.

== Reception ==
The Bop House has been criticized for maintaining accounts on platforms such as TikTok, which are widely used by minors, while linking to adult content on OnlyFans. While Bop House content includes typical social media themes such as dance challenges and lifestyle videos, members frequently appear in revealing outfits, including underwear and swimwear. Bop House members, aged 19 to 25, have been noted for cultivating a youthful appearance. Critics argue this branding glamorizes pornography and may encourage teenagers to view explicit content creation as an alternative to education or careers. Member Camilla Araújo commented on these concerns after Julia Filippo earned US$54,000 in one week, stating in a widely viewed video "y'all are sick f***s [sic] because she looks 12".

Following co-founder Sophie Rain's departure, auditioning for the group became a TikTok trend, with teenagers imitating members' routines. The activist Melinda Tankard Reist cited interviews with middle school students reporting pressure to emulate the group's aesthetic, while the youth psychologist Emma Carlisle stated that such content "creates unrealistic beauty ideals and links self-worth to sexualisation, which is incredibly damaging during formative years."
