= Sophie Rain =

American Internet personality

- Born: Miami, Florida, U.S.
- Other name: SophieRaiin
- Occupation: Internet celebrity
- Years active: 2023–present

Instagram information
- Page: sophieraiin
- Years active: 2023–present
- Followers: 8.9 million

TikTok information
- Page: Sophie Rain
- Followers: 15.4 million
- Last updated: August 17, 2026

Sophie Rain is an American internet personality and online content creator. She went viral in late 2024 after announcing that she earned US$43 million in her first year on OnlyFans. Rain co-founded the Bop House, in which she and fellow OnlyFans creators collaborate on each other's online content. She has also appeared in TikTok videos with rapper NLE Choppa.

== Life and career ==
Rain is based in Miami. She was born to an American father and a Filipino mother, and has three siblings. She uses a stage name and says she declines to share her birthday or real age online for privacy reasons. She set up her OnlyFans account in May 2023 and uses the handle "SophieRaiin" across her social media platforms. She has stated that her OnlyFans content was solo and that she was a Christian and a virgin, that she was fired from a restaurant after her boss discovered her account, that she checked in on her home church in Tampa, Florida, when they offered online services, and that she lived on food stamps as a child.

In late June 2024, she and rapper NLE Choppa posted two TikTok videos in which they lipsynched to Choppa's "Slut Me Out 2"; by July 10, the pair had been viewed 27,200,000 times. By Thanksgiving 2024, her account was charging $10 a month. That November, she uploaded a photo of her OnlyFans dashboard stating that she had made $43 million in her first year on the platform, which went viral. In February, she announced that she had made over $50 million in net profit. Her earnings were reportedly enough for her parents to retire.

On December 12, 2024, Rain and fellow OnlyFans creator Aishah Sofey co-founded Bop House, a group of content creators who collaborate on each other's OnlyFans content. Originally based in an Airbnb in Fort Lauderdale, the group moved to another Fort Lauderdale location after their landlord kicked them out, and then moved again, this time to a Brickell skyscraper. In February 2025, NBC Miami reported that Fort Lauderdale police arrested a man accused of breaking into a Fort Lauderdale home associated with Rain. Combined, its initial eight creators had at least 33 million followers on TikTok; by January 7, 2025, the collective itself had 1,300,000 followers. Rain left the house in July 2025 to spend more time on her farm in Tampa, although she continued to film content with the other members.

In August 2025, Rain called into an August MrBeast charity stream for Team Water and pledged $1,000,000; around this time, her OnlyFans profile advertised nude content and footage of her masturbating. In January 2026, she denied claims by 2026 Florida gubernatorial election Republican primary candidate James Fishback that the site was exploiting her, and criticized his plans to implement a 50% "sin tax" on OnlyFans income. Rain mocked Fishback's defeat in the Republican primary on August 18, where Fishback was defeated by U.S. representative Byron Donalds.
