= $456,000 Squid Game in Real Life! =

2021 YouTube video by MrBeast

- Thumbnail for "$456,000 Squid Game in Real Life!" on YouTube
- Based on: Squid Game by Hwang Dong-hyuk
- Produced by: Jimmy Donaldson
- Release date: November 24, 2021
- Running time: 25 minutes
- Country: United States
- Language: English
- Budget: $3.5 million

"$456,000 Squid Game in Real Life!" is a YouTube video by American YouTuber Jimmy Donaldson, known on the platform as MrBeast. The video, released on November 24, 2021, is a competition based on the games featured in the 2021 South Korean Netflix show Squid Game.

Donaldson began work on the video in October 2021. Partially funded by Finnish video game developer Supercell to promote its mobile game Brawl Stars, the video cost US$3.5 million to produce, of which $2 million was spent on sets and production and $1.5 million was given as cash prizes to the contestants. Donaldson recreated several of the show's sets for the video. As in the show, the 456 players competed in a series of games until only one player remained.

After the video was published on November 24, 2021, it quickly received over 100 million views and became MrBeast's most-viewed video (not including Shorts). As of November 2026, it has received over 982 million views. Publications praised Donaldson for his accurate recreations of the sets, but some critics saw the video as unoriginal and a misunderstanding of Squid Game's anti-capitalist themes. Donaldson later created a second video with a similar theme, "50 YouTubers Fight for $1,000,000", which featured a challenge adapting the dalgona-cutting "game" from Squid Game. He also developed an Amazon Prime Video television series, Beast Games, which was similar in concept but did not use Squid Game branding.

== Background ==
Squid Game is a South Korean television series developed by Hwang Dong-hyuk and first released on Netflix in 2021. The show centers around a fictional game show in which 456 indebted contestants compete to the death in variants of traditional children's games to win a large cash prize. The show received critical acclaim and became Netflix's most-viewed show in its first month. In November 2021, Josh Coulson of TheGamer described Squid Game as a "worldwide phenomenon".

Jimmy Donaldson created the YouTube channel MrBeast in 2012. The channel rose to popularity in 2017 for Donaldson's stunts and challenges, which tend to be philanthropic, ambitious, and expensive. MrBeast became one of the most-subscribed YouTube channels, with 75.9 million subscribers by the time "$456,000 Squid Game in Real Life!" was released.

== Production ==
On October 11, 2021, Donaldson published a video on TikTok saying he would recreate Squid Game if the video received 10 million likes, which was achieved. Work on the video began in mid-October. YouTuber William Osman was hired by Donaldson to lead an engineering team to create blood squibs to explode with fake blood on a contestant's elimination; Osman was given three weeks to deliver five hundred of the devices.

"$456,000 Squid Game in Real Life!" cost US$3.5 million to produce. The video was sponsored and partially funded by Supercell to promote its mobile game Brawl Stars. $2 million of the budget was spent on sets and production, while the remaining $1.5 million was used for cash prizes. Matt Pearce of the Los Angeles Times noted that the video cost $134,600 per screen minute to produce, while Squid Game itself cost approximately $43,500 per screen minute. Donaldson recreated several sets from the show, including the contestants' bunk room, the tug of war platform, and the indoor playground. Some of the post-production was completed by visual effects company SoKrispyMedia.

== Video ==
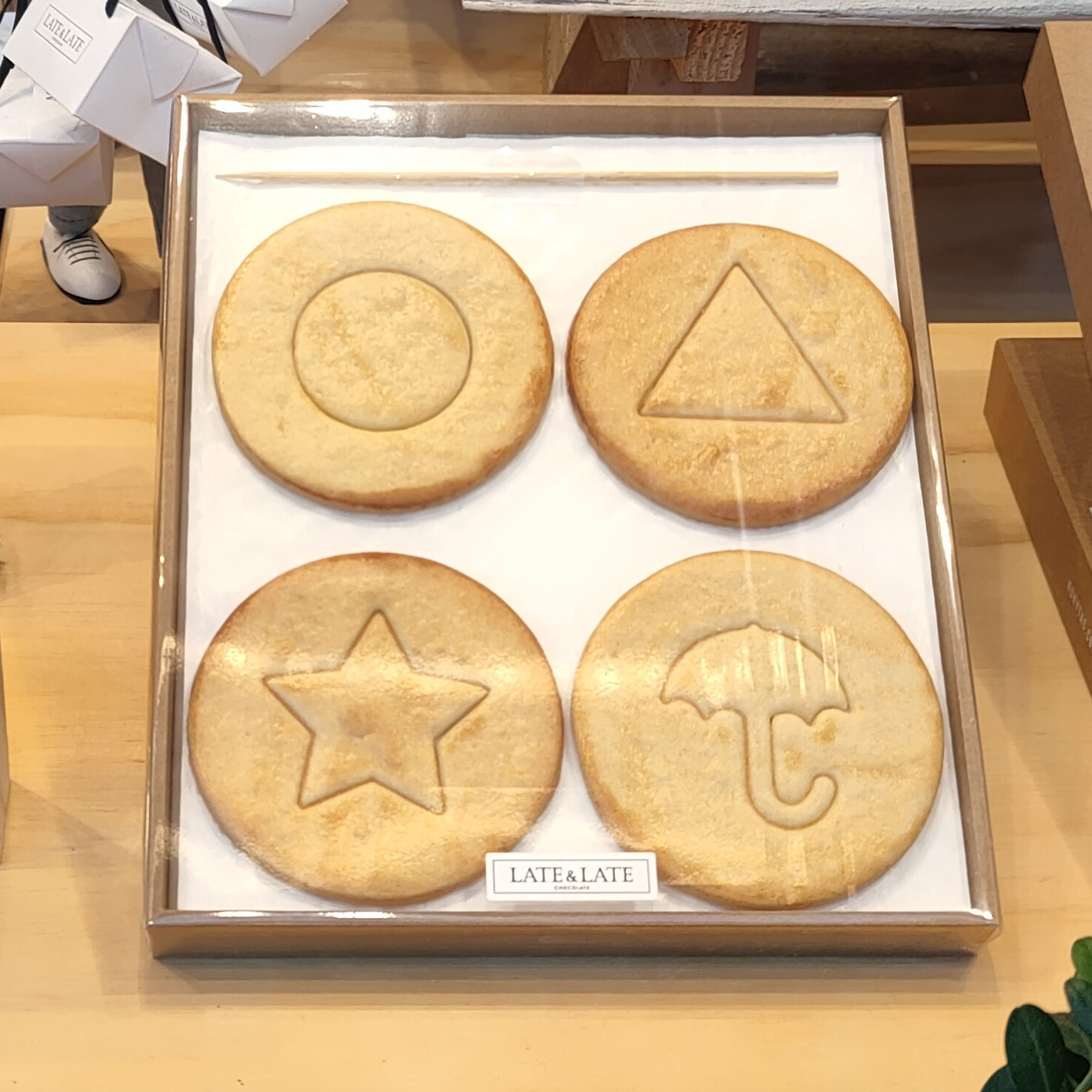
Dalgona, a Korean candy used as a game round in the video and the TV show

"$456,000 Squid Game in Real Life!" is a recreation based on Squid Game and is not intended to be a parody, according to PC Gamer. Donaldson cast 456 contestants, and a $456,000 prize was awarded to the winner. Eliminated players are given at least $2000 each as a consolation prize. Mirroring the show, the players competed in a series of games, each reducing the number of players. The games were, in order: Red Light, Green Light; the Dalgona game; the marble game; tug-of-war; ddakji; the glass bridge challenge; and musical chairs. There were some deviations from the show: Donaldson's game included ddakji as a round, which was featured in the show but not as a game round. Additionally, the final round was musical chairs instead of the show's titular squid. The winner of the grand prize was player 079.

== Release and reception ==
The video was published to the MrBeast YouTube channel on November 24, 2021. The video reached 100 million views within three days and quickly became one of Donaldson's most-viewed videos. Brawl Stars saw a 41 percent increase in downloads and a 54 percent increase in revenue within six days of the video's release. Interviewed at the 2021 Gotham Awards, Squid Game creator Hwang Dong-hyuk responded to the video, saying "I loved it, and it helped me to promote the show, too, so I want more people to do it." Jennifer Bisset of CNET described the re-enactment as "scarily real-looking", and journalists from Polygon and Vice News described it as "perfect". Reality TV editor Katherine Griffin likened the video to reality television for its style and length, but disapproved of its lack of credits for the editors. Charles Cameron of Screen Rant praised the video's faithful re-enactment and called it an "admirable homage", but criticized its use of product placement for "ruin[ing] the immersion".

After the view count of "$456,000 Squid Game in Real Life!" surpassed that of Squid Game itself on Netflix, YouTube's former head of creator product marketing, Jon Youshaei, tweeted in praise. He wrote that the video having a higher view count, a shorter production time, and "fewer gatekeepers" than Squid Game exemplified "the promise of the creator economy." The tweet was criticized by publications and Internet users for ignoring the differences between the production of a television series and that of a YouTube video, and for apparently dismissing Donaldson's debt to the creators of Squid Game. Youshaei ultimately deleted his tweet. Critiquing the concept of the creator economy in response to Youshaei, Amanda Silberling of TechCrunch noted how creators who make high-budget videos must continuously increase their budgets such that viewers do not "become desensitized" to their production value and novelty. As Donaldson has stated that he makes "razor-thin [profit] margins" on his videos, Silberling argued that these increases in expenditure are unsustainable, writing "the success of [the video] may be better news for YouTube, or even Netflix, than it is for Donaldson". Gita Jackson of Vice News and Hussein Kesvani of Polygon saw the video as exemplary of a "fundamental" problem of YouTube: derivative and unoriginal content which profits from the work of others (e.g. reaction videos); Kesvani described the video as the "logical conclusion of this creator economy".

Donaldson received criticism from some journalists and the wider online public for a perceived misunderstanding of Squid Game's anti-capitalist themes. Jackson called the video "perverse" and a "recreation of the villain's ultimate desire to watch desperate people compete for money purely for his amusement". According to Silberling, the video lacked the "emotional resonance and suspense" of the show because the contestants faced no risk of punishment for losing. Tyler Wilde of PC Gamer considered it "hard to declare that $3.5 million spent on a YouTube video and cash prizes is bad, but $21.4 million spent on a Netflix show is good" in light of criticism of the video's large budget, calling it "about as accurate [a recreation] as you can get without actually shooting anyone".

Matt Pearce of the Los Angeles Times described stylistic differences between the show and the video, such as the replacement of Squid Game's "high-minded social commentary" with "the MrBeast house style of upbeat stunt philanthropy". Pearce noted the "narrative efficiency" of its extensive use of fast cuts, music changes, and sound effects and graphics in the style of American reality television. Like Donaldson's other videos, the video uses clickbait marketing and an "outrageously absurd" premise to convince viewers to watch, a style that Donaldson has "pioneered and perfected" according to Amanda Silberling of TechCrunch.

== See also ==
- Squid Game: The Challenge, a 2023 reality television series
