= 95th Brigade =

95th Brigade may refer to:

== Spain ==
- 95th Mixed Brigade

== Ukraine ==
- 95th Air Assault Brigade
  - Raid of the 95th Brigade

== United Kingdom ==
- 95th Brigade (United Kingdom)
- 95th Brigade, Royal Field Artillery, a British Army unit during World War I
- 95th (Hampshire Yeomanry) Brigade, Royal Field Artillery, a British Army unit after World War I

== United States ==
- 95th Civil Affairs Brigade

== See also ==
- 95th Division (disambiguation)
- 95th Regiment (disambiguation)
