= Naughty List =

2020 song by Liam Payne and Dixie D'Amelio

Single by Liam Payne and Dixie D'Amelio
- Released: 30 October 2020
- Recorded: 2020
- Genre: Christmas pop; dance-pop; R&B
- Length: 2:34
- Label: Capitol
- Songwriters: Liam James Payne; Ben Kohn; Ed Drewett; Ella Henderson; Janée Bennett; Peter Kelleher; Tom Barnes
- Producer: TMS

Liam Payne singles chronology
| "Midnight" (2020) | "Naughty List" (2020) | "Sunshine" (2021) |

Dixie D'Amelio singles chronology
| "Be Happy" (2020) | "Naughty List" (2020) | "One Whole Day" (2020) |

"Naughty List" is a song by British singer Liam Payne and American TikTok personality and singer Dixie D'Amelio. It was released as a single on 30 October 2020. The song was written by Ben Kohn, Ed Drewett, Ella Henderson, Janée Bennett, Pete Kelleher and Tom Barnes.

== Credits and personnel ==
Credits adapted from Tidal.

- TMS – producer
- Ben Kohn – composer, lyricist, associated performer, organ
- Ed Drewett – composer, lyricist, associated performer, background vocalist
- Ella Henderson – composer, lyricist
- Janée Bennett – composer, lyricist
- Pete Kelleher – composer, lyricist, associated performer, bells
- Tom Barnes – composer, lyricist, associated performer, drums
- Matt Wolach – assistant mixer, studio personnel
- Dixie D'Amelio – associated performer, vocals
- Liam Payne – associated performer, vocals
- Vern Asbury – associated performer, guitar
- Randy Merrill – mastering engineer, studio personnel
- Mark Stent – mixer, studio personnel
- Caleb Hulin – studio personnel, vocal engineer
- Chris Bishop – studio personnel, vocal engineer

== Charts ==
Chart performance for "Naughty List"
| Chart (2020) | Peak position |
|---|---|
| Ireland (IRMA) | 49 |
| New Zealand Hot Singles (RMNZ) | 33 |
| UK Singles (Official Charts) | 48 |
| US Holiday Digital Song Sales (Billboard) | 4 |
