= Vinnie Hacker =

American influencer and model (born 2002)

- Born: Vincent Cole Hacker; July 14, 2002 (age 24); Seattle, Washington, U.S.
- Education: O'Dea High School
- Occupations: Influencer; model; online streamer
- Years active: 2019–present

TikTok information
- Page: vhackerr
- Followers: 14.9 million
- Last updated: January 23, 2026

Vinnie Hacker (born July 14, 2002) is an American influencer and model. He became popular on TikTok starting in 2020, largely for posting thirst trap–style videos, and amassed more than 15 million followers by 2023. He joined the TikTok content house the Hype House in 2021, also starring in a Netflix reality television series of the same name (2022) about the house. Hacker participated in the 2021 exhibition boxing event Battle of the Platforms, where he defeated YouTuber Deji. He began modeling at age 15 and signed with IMG Models in 2023. He live streams on Twitch, where, as of 2025, he has more than one million followers.

== Early life ==
Hacker was born on July 14, 2002 in Seattle and raised in a Catholic household; he attended O'Dea High School, an all-boys private school, where he played baseball. His father works as an electrician while his mother, Maria, works as an emergency dispatcher. He also has a younger brother, Reggie. He began video game livestreaming at age 13 and was first scouted to work as a model at age 15. Prior to becoming an influencer, he planned on attending community college for fire science and becoming a firefighter.

== Career ==
Hacker began posting videos on TikTok in 2020. A "thirst trap" video of him standing in front of his mirror went viral on the platform while he was a junior in high school, earning him hundreds of thousands of followers, and he moved to Los Angeles one week after turning 18 years old, where he lived for eight months before moving to Thousand Oaks; he later became known on TikTok for his lip syncing and other thirst trap–style videos. He was a member of Sway Gaming, the TikTok content house Sway House's gaming wing, before departing in early January 2021 and joining the TikTok collective the Hype House later that month.

Hacker appeared in a Netflix reality television series about the Hype House the following year, which partially focused on his struggles with being overly sexualized online and his desire to move from posting thirst traps to becoming a full-time Twitch streamer. The Guardian's Adrian Horton referred to him by the show's premiere as the "star du jour" of the Hype House. He participated in Social Gloves: Battle of the Platforms, an exhibition boxing match between various YouTubers and TikTokers, in June 2021. He fought against YouTuber Deji, whom he knocked out to become the only TikToker of the night to win their match.

Hacker signed with the management organization Underscore Talent and the esports organization 100 Thieves in 2022, and with Creative Artists Agency and IMG Models in 2023, by which point he had more than 15 million followers on TikTok. He was featured in a promotional short film directed by Xavier Dolan for a collaborative capsule collection by H&M and Rabanne in October 2023. He was a presenter at the 8th Crunchyroll Anime Awards in March 2024 and starred in advertising campaigns for Hugo Boss and Yves Saint Laurent's MYSLF Le Parfum fragrance in February and October of that year, respectively. By mid-2024, Hacker had more than one million followers on Twitch, where he primarily live streams his gameplay of first-person shooters such as Valorant and Apex Legends. By 2025, he had more than 4.7 million followers on Instagram. He voiced the character of Slur, a mysterious hitman, in Netflix's anime adaptation of Sakamoto Days, which premiered in 2025.

In May 2026, He appeared in the third season of the HBO teen drama series Euphoria.

== Public image ==
Hacker has been described in the media as a heartthrob. He is also known for his many tattoos.

== Filmography ==
Key
†	Denotes productions that have not yet been released

Year	Title	Role	Notes	Ref.
2021	Social Gloves: Battle of the Platforms	Himself	Pay-per-view boxing event	
2022	Hype House	Himself	Main role	
2025	Sakamoto Days	Slur / Kei Uzuki	English dub, voice role	
2026	Euphoria	Ricky D	Episode "Kitty Likes To Dance"	
TBA	My Boyfriend Is A Demon †	TBA	Filming	
