= Leonid Radvinsky =

American businessman (1982–2026)

- Леонід Радвінський
- Radvinsky c. 2020
- Born: Leonid Saveliyovych Radvinsky; May 30, 1982; Odesa, Ukrainian SSR, Soviet Union
- Died: March 20, 2026 (aged 43)
- Education: Northwestern University (BA)
- Years active: 1999–2026
- Known for: Majority owner of OnlyFans
- Spouse: Katie Chudnovsky (m. 2008)
- Children: 4
- Website: www.lr.com

Leonid Saveliyovych Radvinsky (Note: Ukrainian: Леонід Савелійович Радвінський, romanized: Leonid Saveliyovych Radvinskyi) (May 30, 1982 – March 20, 2026) was an American billionaire businessman and the majority owner of OnlyFans. Born in the Ukrainian SSR, Radvinsky was the founder of the cam site MyFreeCams (through his holding company, MFCXY, Inc.), and the majority owner of OnlyFans, a content subscription service website, mostly used by pornographic actresses to sell their pornographic content. His website lists his personal investment portfolio. He had an estimated net worth of $4.7 billion at the time of his death, according to Forbes.

== Early life and education ==
Radvinsky was born in Odesa on May 30, 1982, to a Jewish family. His family later emigrated to Chicago when he was a child. He attended Glenbrook South High School in Glenview, Illinois. In 2002, he graduated from Northwestern University with a degree in economics.

== Career ==
=== Early career ===
In 1999, when Radvinsky was 17 years old, he helped incorporate Cybertania Inc., a website referral business. During the late 1990s and early 2000s, Radvinsky developed more than ten websites such as Password Universe, Working Passes, and Ultra Passwords that claimed and were advertised to provide users with "illegal" and "hacked" passwords to porn sites, where he earned money for every click; one of the involved websites advertised more than 10,000 "illegal pre-teen passwords". However, according to Forbes, there was not any evidence suggesting the sites actually linked to illegal content. Ultra Passwords reportedly earned $1.8 million a year in revenue during the 2000s.

In 2004, Radvinsky founded MyFreeCams, an adult streaming website. The same year, Microsoft sued Radvinsky for allegedly sending millions of deceptive emails to Hotmail users, but the case was eventually dismissed.

=== Venture capital ===
Radvinsky operated a venture capital fund called "Leo", founded in 2009, which invests mainly in tech companies. The fund's notable investments include Israel-based B4X and the social networking software Pleroma.

=== OnlyFans ===
In 2018, Radvinsky bought a 75% stake in OnlyFans' parent company Fenix International Ltd. from its British founders Tim Stokely and his father Guy Stokely. After this, OnlyFans became increasingly focused on not safe for work (NSFW) content and "gained a pop culture reputation for being a hive of pornography". OnlyFans had annual revenues in excess of $6.6 billion as of November 2023, with revenues growing 19% per year. Radvinsky received $472 million in dividends from the website in 2023, up from $338 million and $284 million in 2022 and 2021, respectively. Radvinsky was paid $701 million by OnlyFans in 2024.

=== Philanthropy ===
In 2024, Radvinsky and his wife were both major public supporters of a $23 million grant program for cancer research, which was announced at a gastrointestinal research foundation gala. He donated $5 million to Ukraine relief in 2022 as well as a cancer charity, an animal-welfare organization, and a skin-disorder-research fund. Radvinsky also donated to the Memorial Sloan Kettering Cancer Center and the West Suburban Humane Society.

Radvinsky indicated on his personal website his aspiration to sign The Giving Pledge, a public commitment by wealthy individuals to donate the majority of their fortune to philanthropic causes.

== Personal life ==
Radvinsky was married to Yekaterina "Katie" Chudnovsky, an attorney and philanthropist. Radvinsky married Yekaterina in 2008, they have four children. He led a private life and only a few photos of him appear to exist. Radvinsky's website does not mention OnlyFans but lists his investments in open source software. Later in his life, Radvinsky became a recluse and lived in a $19 million, 6,000-square-foot (560 m^{2}) oceanfront condo in the Miami area.

Radvinsky's website states, "A first-generation immigrant from Ukraine, technology was imprinted on Leo at an early age while gaming with BASIC on his grandfather's i386 PC. Leo went on to study economics at Northwestern University, where high marks led him to become class valedictorian. In his downtime, Leo is an avid reader who’s always ready for a chess match and is an aspiring helicopter pilot. He currently resides in sunny Florida."

=== Political activity ===
In 2023, according to The Lever's reporting on confidential internal documents obtained from AIPAC—a pro-Israel lobbying group—Radvinsky and his wife had contributed $11 million to the organization. When emailed for comment, AIPAC strongly condemned the report, and Radvinsky denied his contribution, writing "I don't know" when asked why his name appeared in the documentation. The Lever also reported the existence of a documented wire transfer from Radvinsky's wife to the organization.

=== Technology ===
Radvinsky was a supporter of the Elixir programming language.

== Death ==
Radvinsky died on March 20, 2026, at the age of 43, following a long period of cancer previously kept secret. OnlyFans released a statement announcing his death on March 23, saying they were "deeply saddened" by the news.
