= Psycho (Dixie D'Amelio song) =

2021 single by Dixie D'Amelio

Single by Dixie featuring Rubi Rose
- Released: July 23, 2021
- Recorded: 2021
- Genre: Pop
- Length: 2:30
- Label: Hitco
- Songwriters: Claire Chicha; Cooper Holzman; Dixie D'Amelio; Paris Douglas; Peter Joeseph Fenn; Randall Hammers; Rubi Rose
- Producer: Cooper Holzman

Dixie singles chronology
| "Fuckboy" (2021) | "Psycho" (2021) | "The Real Thing" (2021) |

"Psycho" is a song by American social media personality and singer Dixie D'Amelio featuring American rapper Rubi Rose. The song was released on July 23, 2021. It was produced by Cooper Holzman.

== Background and composition ==
"Psycho" is a pop track influenced by Dua Lipa. The music video was released at midnight on August 5, 2021. The video was directed by Steven Gomillion.

D’Amelio explained that the inspiration for the song comes from a friend's experience with a cheating boyfriend. In an interview with American radio DJ Zach Sang, she said: “I kind of wrote it about other people’s relationships and what I have seen… I have a friend who was dating this guy, and the guy was texting girls off the girl’s phone. So, [texting them] off his girlfriend’s phone and deleting the messages. But like, ‘Hey, I wanna hang out. All three of us should hang out.’ All that stuff.”

When describing the collaboration between D’Amelio and Rose, Hitco cofounder L.A. Reid said: “The chemistry between Dixie and Rubi is undeniable. ‘Psycho’ represents what happens when two dynamic female stars from their own lanes come together and make a real statement record. I know their fans are going to go crazy for it!”

== Marketing ==
When D’Amelio first released the demo of the song on TikTok, listeners heard a mispronunciation of the word "psycho", sounding like "shyco". D’Amelio explained the reasoning behind releasing a demo including the mispronunciation was to orchestrate an elaborate publicity stunt, claiming she has used this tactic previously when launching other songs.

At the "Psycho" music video's premiere party, D’Amelio was quoted as saying the mispronunciation was caught before the release of the demo, but it was kept in the song in an attempt to garner attention. She asserted, "I just know how the internet works a little bit. Like, I kind of know what I’m doing…. And y'all just keep falling for it [the publicity stunts]."

Despite the revision of the mispronunciation for the final cut, D'Amelio and producer Holzman chose to include it at the end of the song.

== Charts ==
Chart performance for "Psycho"
| Chart (2021) | Peak position |
|---|---|
| US Pop Airplay (Billboard) | 25 |
