= Brooke Monk =

American social media personality (born 2003)

- Born: January 31, 2003 (age 23)
- Occupation: Social media personality
- Years active: 2019–present
- Partner: Sam Dezz

Instagram information
- Page: Brooke Monk
- Years active: 2020–present
- Followers: 8.3 million

TikTok information
- Page: Brooke Monk
- Years active: 2019–present
- Followers: 48.9 million

YouTube information
- Channel: Brooke Monk
- Years active: 2019–present
- Subscribers: 11.9 million
- Views: 14.4 billion
- Last updated: 10 October 2026

Brooke Monk (born January 31, 2003) is an American social media personality. She began posting videos on TikTok in 2019, becoming known for comedy videos acting out situations in her life. She has gained more than 48 million followers on the platform, making her one of TikTok's most-followed users.

== Early life ==
Monk grew up in Colorado with four sisters. She started a makeup channel on YouTube when she was 14, but she later deleted the account. Her parents did not allow her to have a cellphone until she was 16, but she then became TikTok-famous within a year. She was homeschooled and graduated at 17.

== Career ==
Monk began posting on the video-sharing platform TikTok at age 16 in 2019. She had a million followers within two months; her first video to go viral, portraying a girl looking at her crush, received 4 million views in 24 hours. She quickly built a large following as she continued to post comedy, lifestyle, lip sync, and dance choreography videos. She became especially known for videos acting out relatable situations in her life. Within two years, as TikTok boomed during the COVID-19 pandemic, she had more than 16 million followers on the platform. She also launched a YouTube channel for long-form content.

Monk moved to Los Angeles to continue her career. In 2023, as she surpassed 28 million TikTok followers, she briefly stayed with the TikTok influencer collective Hype House for a month and a half. The same year, she launched a swimsuit line with Blackbough Swim. She was posting three times a day by this point, receiving 1.5 million views per video at minimum. She also began a second TikTok account, @notbrookemonk, for less polished content, which gained more than 10 million followers.

Ranking among TikTok's most-followed users, Monk reached more than 40 million followers in 2025, earning a nomination for Creator of the Year at the inaugural TikTok Awards. Forbes said that she had "clearly mastered the art of comedic storytelling on TikTok". She also had more than 9 million YouTube subscribers by this time. She launched her own false eyelash brand, Doting Beauty, in 2026.

== Personal life ==
Monk has been in a relationship with fellow influencer Sam Dezz since 2020. She is a Christian. She is a runner and participated in the 2025 New York City Marathon.

== Awards and nominations ==
Award	Year	Recipient(s) and nominee(s)	Category	Result	Ref.
Nickelodeon Kids' Choice Awards	2025	Brooke Monk	Favorite Female Creator	Nominated	
Nickelodeon Kids' Choice Awards	2026	Brooke Monk	Favorite Female Creator	Nominated	
TikTok Awards US	2025	Brooke Monk	Creator of the Year	Nominated	
