= Thomas Petrou =

American internet personality (born 1998)

- Petrou in 2026
- Born: Thomas Adrian Petrou; September 2, 1998 (age 28); San Diego, California, U.S.
- Occupations: TikToker; YouTuber
- Years active: 2015–present
- Known for: TikTok and YouTube channels

Thomas Adrian Petrou (born 2 September 1998) is an American social media personality and entrepreneur of Greek descent, known for his TikTok and YouTube channels. Petrou is a founder of The Hype House, a group of online-content creators and the Hollywood Spanish-style mansion that they reside in together. Thomas also briefly lived in the Team 10 house before being fired for unknown reasons in August 2019. As of August 8, 2022, Petrou has amassed over 1.87 million subscribers on YouTube and 7.9 million followers on TikTok.

== Career ==
Petrou joined YouTube in 2015. Petrou joined Team 10 in May 2019 before announcing that he had been fired three months later for "no reason." Seven months after concluding his time at Team 10, he co-founded The Hype House, a collective of creators who live in a large-house in Los Angeles and make content together, with Alex Warren, Kouvr Annon, Daisy Keech, and Chase Hudson.

Alongside other Hype House members, Petrou starred in a reality television series about the collective, also titled Hype House, which premiered on Netflix on January 7, 2022.

== Personal life ==
Petrou began dating fellow social media personality and Hype House member Mia Hayward in 2020.

== Controversies ==
In March 2020, Daisy Keech left The Hype House after claiming she felt as though she was being left out of important decisions regarding the group, before suing Petrou and other founding member Hudson. In May 2020, controversy arose between Bryce Hall, a member of another online-content creator collective called the Sway House, and Petrou. Hall accused Petrou of stealing money from members of The Hype House and handling his personal financials poorly. After Petrou direct messaged Hall suggesting that they should work through their problems on Hall's podcast, Hall posted the screenshot of the messages to which Petrou responded by posting more of their online interactions in order to provide context to the situation.
