= Amrapali Gan =

Indian-American businesswoman

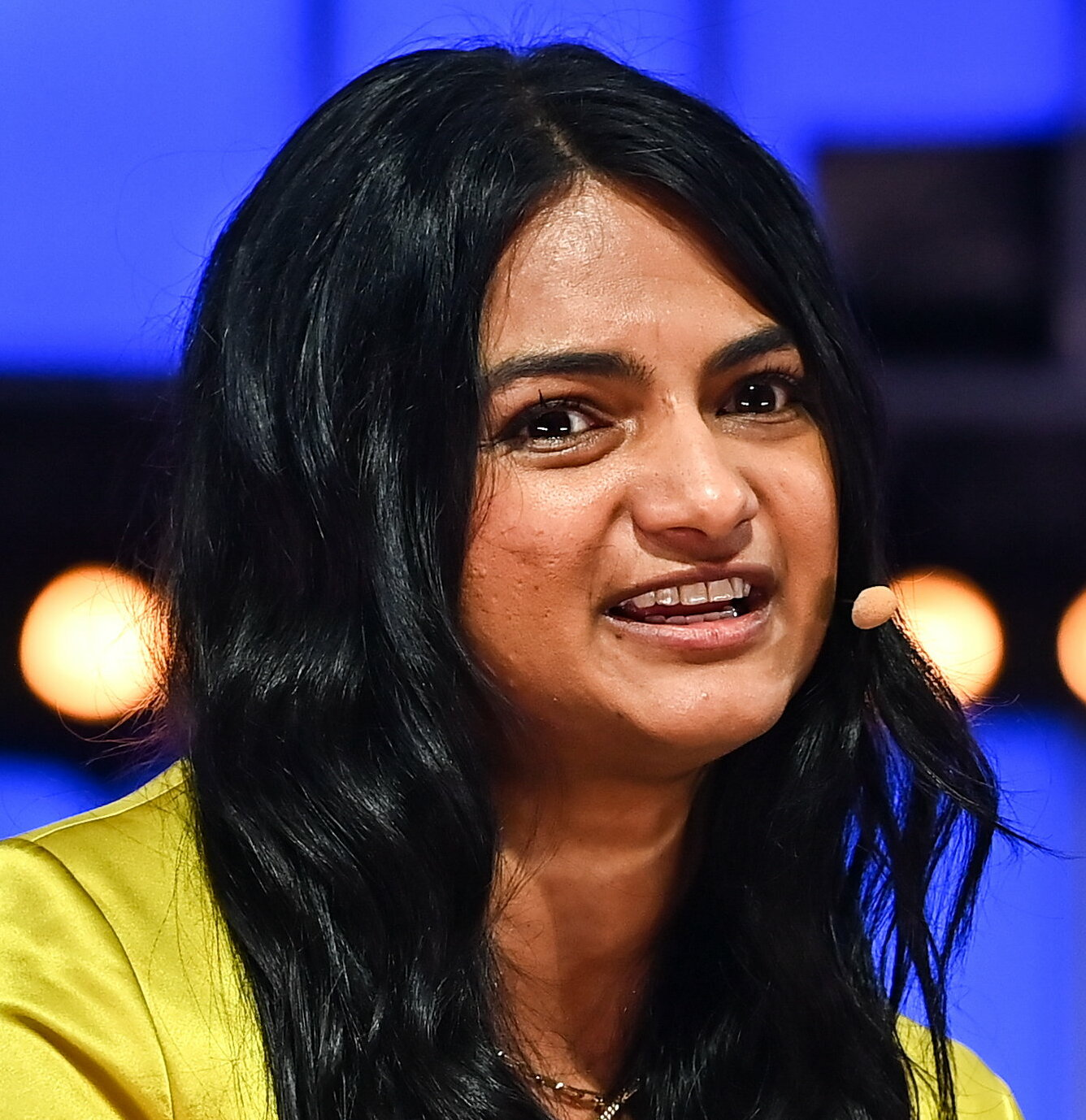
- Born: 1985; Mumbai (India)
- Education: California State University, Los Angeles
- Occupations: Marketing executive, chief executive officer
- Employer: OnlyFans (2021–2023)
- Website: onlyfans.com/amrapali

Amrapali Gan is an Indian-American businesswoman. In December 2021, While CEO of OnlyFans, Gan made decisions about whether the company would host sexually explicit material, because of concerns that the site was exploiting women. Gan sought to establish a safe space for creators of explicit material, while not conducting illegal activity. She stepped down in July 2023 being replaced by Keily Blair.

She has previously worked for Red Bull and Quest Nutrition, and a cannabis cafe in West Hollywood.

== Early life ==
Gan was born in Mumbai, Maharashtra, India in 1984 or 1985, and grew up in Virginia, USA. She is a graduate of California State University, Los Angeles.
