= 95th Street =

95th Street may refer to:

- 95th Street (Chicago)
  - 95th Street/Beverly Hills station, on the Rock Island District Beverly branch
  - 95th Street/Chicago State University station, on the Metra Electric District
  - 95th/Dan Ryan station, a Chicago Transit Authority bus station and Red Line terminal
  - 95th Street/Longwood station, on the Rock Island District main line
- 95th Street (Manhattan)
