= Keily Blair =

Irish lawyer and executive (born c. 1982)

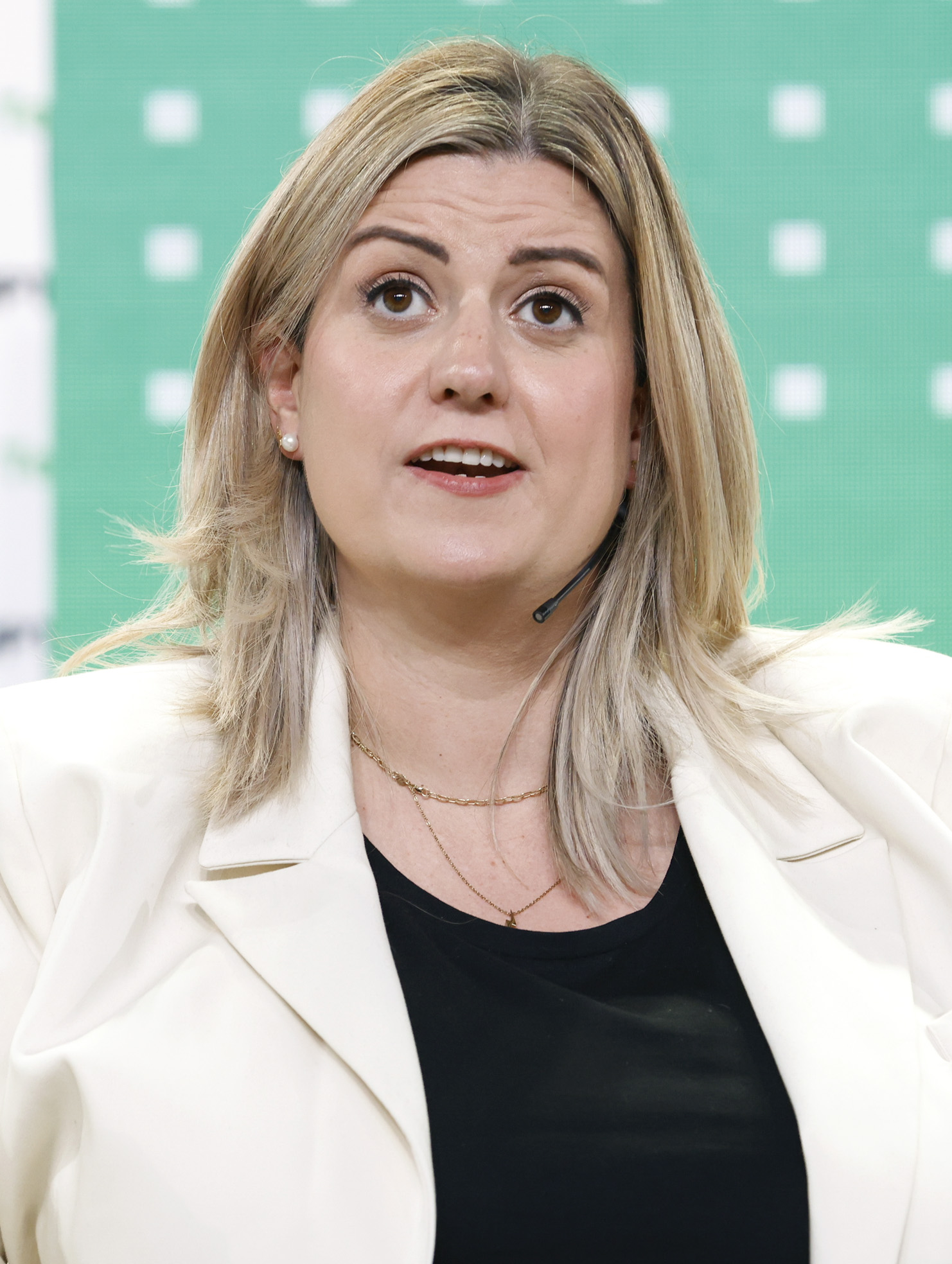
- Blair at TechCrunch Disrupt 2022
- Born: 1982 or 1983 (age 42–43); Dublin, Ireland
- Education: Oxford Brookes University
- Occupations: Executive; lawyer
- Known for: CEO of OnlyFans

Keily Blair (born 1982 or 1983) is an Irish lawyer and business executive who is the CEO of OnlyFans.

== Early life and education ==
Keily Blair (born 1982 or 1983) is a native of Dublin, Ireland, where she attended a private Catholic school for girls. Blair studied law and politics at Oxford Brookes University.

== Career ==
Blair is trained as a lawyer and spent early career years in English law firms. The Legal Cheek Careers Team notes that "[b]y the time Blair started the LPC [Legal Practice Course] at BPP [Law School] in 2004, she’d secured a training contract at... [the] firm Allen & Overy", a "Magic Circle" firm, joining them (by her description) in September 2005. Blair joined the Morrison & Foerster London office in March 2010 as a senior associate in the litigation group. There, she primarily acted for organisations and C-suite level individuals in connection with contentious and non-contentious regulatory compliance and corruption investigations.

In 2015, Blair founded FractioVitri, a network that helps women under-35 progress in the City.

Blair joined Pricewaterhouse Coopers (PwC) in January 2017 as a Director in the commercial litigation and regulatory disputes team. At PwC she also served as co-lead of their contentious data protection strategy and legal and compliance services.

In February 2020, Orrick, Herrington & Sutcliffe announced that Blair would be joining as a Partner to lead their cyber, privacy, and data innovation practice in London. OnlyFans was one of her clients. She departed after being recruited by OnlyFans, where she began as chief strategy and operations officer; Todd Spangler, writing for Variety, describes her initial responsibilities there as leading their "trust and safety operations and [being] responsible for developing, executing and communicating OnlyFans’ strategic initiatives and future goals to users, commercial partners and other key stakeholders." During this time, she advocated for the Online Safety Bill in the UK.

In July 2023, Blair was named chief executive officer of OnlyFans, succeeding Amrapali Gan. In a Financial Times interview, Blair characterised OnlyFans as "an incredible UK tech success story". She told the Financial Times that both her and the company's CFO have had issues opening bank accounts due to the "risk profile" associated with OnlyFans being their employer.

== Awards and recognition ==
Blair was the recipient of the "Women in the City Future Leaders Award" in 2015. In 2016, she won Spark21's "Inspirational Women in Law Award", its first recipient.

== Personal life ==
As of September 2022, Blair lived in London. As of January 2018, she was described as being a single parent to two.
