= 95th Division =

In military terms, 95th Division or 95th Infantry Division may refer to:

== Infantry divisions ==
- 95th Division (People's Republic of China)
- 95th Infantry Division (German Empire)
- 95th Infantry Division (Wehrmacht), Germany
- 95th Guards Rifle Division, Soviet Union
- 95th Rifle Division, Soviet Union
- 95th Infantry Division (United States)

== Aviation divisions ==
- 95th Fighter Aviation Division, Soviet Union

== See also ==
- List of military divisions by number
- 95th Brigade (disambiguation)
- 95th Regiment (disambiguation)
- 95th Squadron (disambiguation)
