= The Hype House =

Defunct collective of TikTok and other social media creators

- Formation: December 2019; 6 years ago
- Founders: Chase Hudson; Thomas Petrou; Daisy Keech; Alex Warren
- Founded at: Los Angeles, California
- Dissolved: August 2024; 2 years ago
- Purpose: Entertainment
- Origins: TikTok

The Hype House was a collective of young TikTok personalities based in California, United States. It was also the name of the mansion in which some of the creators lived. It was a collaborative content-creation house, allowing the different influencers and content creators to make videos together easily.

The former house in Moorpark was a Spanish-style mansion perched at the top of a gated street. It has a palatial backyard, a pool, an outdoor gym, a whirlpool spa, and a large kitchen and dining quarters. The Hype House location has changed twice; the collaborative originally used a series of two different houses in Los Angeles proper before moving to its final location in Moorpark before it was sold away in August 2024. The membership of the collaborative has also evolved over time.

The last active members before it was dissolved included Thomas Petrou and Mia Hayward.

== History ==
The Hype House began in December 2019 in Los Angeles as a collective of Gen Z influencers largely from TikTok. It was co-founded by Daisy Keech, Thomas Petrou, Chase Hudson (aka Lil Huddy), and Alex Warren. The founding idea was to bring content creators under one roof to collaborate more easily and build audiences together.

The Hype House included many well‑known names such as Charli D’Amelio, Dixie D’Amelio, Addison Rae, the Lopez brothers, Avani Gregg, Kouvr Annon, among others in its early days. They moved into a mansion that served both as a home and content creation space.

In March 2020, the music video for Blueberry Faygo by Lil Mosey was filmed at The Hype House mansion in Los Angeles. It was released by Lyrical Lemonade and featured Addison Rae and Lil Huddy.

Its membership peaked at twenty-one members before cofounder Daisy Keech, citing internal disputes with other members as the reason for her departure, quit in March 2020. In May 2020, the D'Amelios' representative confirmed the sisters also left the collective when "The Hype House started to become more of a business."

Larray, who was already an established YouTuber and TikTok personality, joined in January 2020 but confirmed in his livestream that he had left later that year. Russian model Renata Valliulina (also known as Renata Ri) joined the House in December of that year, and left in April 2022.

After being interviewed by Thomas Petrou, content creator Tabitha Swatosh became a Hype House member on January 28, 2022. Brooke Monk and Sam Dezz joined the House on April 1, 2022. Paige Taylor officially became a member on May 14, 2022, but she left in October. Throughout May 2022, the Hype House frequently collaborated with Breezy Boys LA, another content house, to create videos. Then, on June 3, 2022, all the previous Breezy Boy members (Ace Akers, Bryce Parker, Eddie Preciado, Jacob Day, Jackson Dean, and Kristian Ramey) became official Hype House members. All but Jacob Day had left the House by October that year. On April 6, 2023, Petrou announced that he would be selling the mansion but that Hype House would be continuing in some form.

== Reality series ==
On April 22, 2021, Netflix announced that they would be airing a reality series at The Hype House, starring Annon, Dragun, Hacker, Hayward, Hudson, Merritt, Petrou, Warren, and Wright. Hype House premiered on Netflix on January 7, 2022.

== Controversies ==
On July 21, 2020, Nikita Dragun held a surprise birthday party for Larray during the COVID-19 pandemic at the Hype House mansion. The party included internet celebrities such as James Charles and others. At the time of the party, California's COVID-19 cases had just surpassed New York's cases. There was an estimated 67 people in attendance, many of whom were seen without face masks despite local health laws. Photos and videos of the event appeared on social media sites such as Instagram. These posts drew criticism from the public, including other influencers like Elijah Daniel and Tyler Oakley. Larray, and some of the other attendees of the party later apologized.

== Lawsuit ==
On January 24, 2023, the landlord announced he would be suing the Hype House for $300,000, due to unpaid rent and severe damage to the house.

== Members ==
Members of the Hype House included:

- Ace Akers (joined 2022; left August 2022)
- Kouvr Annon
- Nick Austin
- Jacob Day
- Charli D'Amelio (joined 2019; left May 2020)
- Dixie D'Amelio (joined 2019; left May 2020)
- Nikita Dragun
- Sam Dezz
- Calvin Goldby
- Sienna Mae Gomez
- Avani Gregg
- Vinnie Hacker (joined 2022)
- Jake Hayward (joined 2022)
- Mia Hayward (joined 2022)
- Chase Hudson
- Patrick Huston
- Ondreaz Lopez (joined 2019; left September 2020)
- Tony Lopez (joined 2019; left September 2020)
- Daisy Keech (joined 2019; left March 2020)
- Sadie McKenna
- Larri "Larray" Merritt
- Bryce Parker (joined 2022; left October 2022)
- Brooke Monk
- Thomas Petrou
- Olivia Ponton
- Eddie Preciado (joined 2022)
- Addison Rae (joined 2019; left May 2020)
- Kristian Ramey
- Michael Sanzone
- Ryland Storms
- Tabitha Swatosh (joined 2022)
- Paige Taylor (joined 2022)
- Alex Warren
- Jack Wright (joined December 2019)
- James Wright
- Wyatt Xavier
- Connor Yates
- Renata Ri (joined December 2020, left April 2022)

== See also ==
- Sway House
