= Be Happy (Dixie D'Amelio song) =

2020 single by Dixie D'Amelio

Single by Dixie D'Amelio

from the album A Letter to Me
- Released: June 26, 2020
- Genre: Pop; synth-pop
- Length: 3:18
- Label: Self-released
- Songwriters: Billy Mann; Christian Medice; Samantha DeRosa

Dixie D'Amelio singles chronology
"Be Happy" (2020)	"Naughty List" (2020)

Music video
- "Be Happy" on YouTube

"Be Happy" is the debut single by American social media personality and singer Dixie D'Amelio. It was released independently on June 26, 2020 and later included on her debut studio album A Letter to Me.

"Be Happy" peaked at number 55 on the UK Singles Chart and 56 on the Canadian Hot 100 chart. It was written by Billy Mann, Christian Medice, Samantha DeRosa, and Albert Azo (2A).

== Background and composition ==
Days after the song's release, on July 1, the official music video was released on D'Amelio's YouTube channel. The lyrics are about mental illness and depression. In a SiriusXM interview, Dixie reveals her song is to help others realize "they don't need to pretend that life is so perfect and it is okay to have a bad day." She first released an a cappella version on TikTok. She worked with producer Christian Medice in a virtual studio. The song was co-written by Medice, Sam DeRosa and Billy Mann. The pop song features an upbeat tune which is sampled from house building theme from Red Dead Redemption 2. The song amassed over 1 million videos and 1 billion views on TikTok shortly after its release, with promotion from her younger sister Charli D'Amelio, the then most-followed individual on TikTok. In an MTV interview, D'Amelio says she joked around with new friend, Lil Mosey, about collaborating on the song. This joke turned into the real deal and a remix version of "Be Happy" was created. On September 9, 2020, a remix of the song featuring singer-songwriter Blackbear and rapper Lil Mosey was released. The official music video for the "Be Happy" remix was released via D'Amelio's Youtube channel September 20, 2020. Social media personality Noah Beck played singer D'Amelio's love interest in the music video.

== Charts ==
Chart performance for "Be Happy"
Chart (2020)	Peak position
Canada (Canadian Hot 100)	56
Ireland (IRMA)	95
New Zealand Hot Singles (Recorded Music NZ)	8
Scotland Singles (Official Charts)	59
UK Singles (Official Charts)	55
US Bubbling Under Hot 100 Singles (Billboard)	1
US Pop Airplay (Billboard)	36

== Certifications ==
Region	Certification	Certified units/sales
United States (RIAA)	Gold	500,000^{‡}
^{‡} Sales+streaming figures based on certification alone.
