= 95th Infantry Division (German Empire) =

- Allegiance: German Empire
- Branch: Imperial German Army
- Engagements: World War I

The 95th Infantry Division (95. Infanterie-Division) was a formation of the Imperial German Army in World War I.

== History ==
The division was first formed on 1 July 1917 at the Eastern Front, where they fought until the finalisation of the Peace Treaty of Brest-Litovsk. Following the peace treaty and the end of World War I, they continued to function as an occupying force in Ukraine. The final units of the troop returned therefrom to their homes on 16 May 1919 and were subsequently demobilised and finally disbanded.

== Timeline of combats ==
=== 1917 ===
- 1 July until 1 December --- static combat in the Pinsk Marshes
- 2 until 17 December --- Ceasefire
- From 17 December --- Armistice

=== 1918 ===
- Until 18 February --- Armistice
- 18 February until 21 June --- Fighting in support of Ukraine
  - 30 March --- Combat at Krasnoye
  - 10 until 11 April --- Seizing of Belgorod
  - 14 April until 8 May --- Gang warfare north of the Seym River
- 22 June until 15 November --- Occupation of Ukraine
- From 16 November --- Withdrawal from Ukraine

=== 1919 ===
- Until 16 March --- Withdrawal from Ukraine

== Order of battle ==
=== Order of battle at wartime 1917/18 ===
- 10th Reserve-Infanterie-Brigade
  - Landwehr-Infanterie-Regiment Nr. 52
  - Infanterie-Regiment Nr. 423
  - Landwehr-Infanterie-Regiment Nr. 430
  - 4th Eskadron/Oldenburgisches Dragoner-Regiment Nr. 19
  - Reserve-Feldartillerie-Regiment Nr. 69
- Divisions-Nachrichten-Kommandeur Nr. 95

== Commanders ==
Rank	Name	Date
Generalmajor	Wilhelm Neugenbauer	1 July to 1 December 1917
Generalleutnant	Anton von Thiesenhausen	2 December 1917 to 18 Februar 1919
