= Sway House =

American TikTok group

- Formation: January 4, 2020
- Founders: Michael Gruen; Josh Richards; Bryce Hall; Griffin Johnson
- Defunct: February 2021
- Location: Bel Air, Los Angeles
- Origins: TikTok
- Parent organization: TalentX Entertainment

The Sway House, also known as Sway LA or simply Sway, was a TikTok content house, consisting of influencers and internet personalities who resided together to produce content.

Formed in January 2020, it was noted for its rivalry with The Hype House, another content house. The group officially disbanded in February 2021.

== History ==
Sway was created on January 4, 2020 by Michael Gruen via his company TalentX Entertainment, with founding members of the group Josh Richards, Bryce Hall, and Griffin Johnson. The group originally resided and produced their content in a rented 7,800-square-foot mansion in Bel Air, Los Angeles.

Cosmopolitan described the house as "eye-roll-inducing", while Business Insider noted it as resembling a fraternity group engaging in controversies and feuds, and having supporters akin to those of boy bands from the 1990s.

Often referred to as "the One Direction of TikTok", the group consisted of nine members – Richards, Hall, Johnson, Jaden Hossler, Kio Cyr, Anthony Reeves, Quinton Griggs, Blake Gray and Noah Beck.

In May 2020, Hall and Hossler were arrested on drug-related charges. This incident created instability in the group as it disrupted a business deal for its members. Later, Richards and Hall released a single titled "Still Softish" as a diss track in response to a public feud they had with Hype House member Chase Hudson.

Later in the year, Richards & Johnson took a hiatus from the group due to founding a Venture Capital fund, Animal Capital. Shortly after, Hossler left the group to focus on his music career under the stage name "JXDN". Following the exit of Hossler and Richards, the group split into smaller groups, with Griggs and Johnson forming Sway Gaming, and Hall, Gray and Beck remaining as the core Sway group. The three members later moved into a 8,500-square-foot rented mansion for their content production. In August 2020, the city council of Los Angeles disabled the electricity for their house, citing "irresponsible highly-infectious disease spreading", as Hall had hosted a party there a few days prior during the COVID-19 pandemic.

In February 2021, Gruen confirmed to People that Sway House was officially dissolved, stating "if you view Sway as a content collective that lives together and is with each other every day, then yes, it’s over." Despite disbanding in February 2021, Johnson revealed the group had separated as early as December 2020. Several members of the group continued to work with each other for other projects of Sway, such as Sway Fitness, a workout supplement brand; The Sway Life, a reality television show that premiered on March 29, 2021 on Facebook; and Sway Stories, a game developed by Playco.

== Members ==
The Original Five:

- Josh Richards (born January 31, 2002) – founding member
- Bryce Hall (born August 14, 1999) – founding member
- Jaden Hossler (born February 8, 2001)
- Griffin Johnson (born January 13, 1999)
- Anthony Reeves (born November 7, 2001)

Added post forming:

- Kio Cyr (born September 5, 2000)
- Quinton Griggs (born September 8, 2003)
- Blake Gray (born January 9, 2001)
- Noah Beck (born May 4, 2001)

== See also ==
- The Hype House
