= Creator economy =

Economy of online content creators

The creator economy, also known as influencer economy, is a platform-driven economy in which creators produce content, products, or services and distribute them directly to their audience through social media platforms and emerging technologies. This economic model is based on the ability of creators to build and maintain communities of users, monetizing their creative activity through multiple channels including advertising, sponsorships, product sales, crowdfunding, and subscription-based services.

Creators include various professional categories such as social media influencers, YouTubers, bloggers, artists, online educators, podcasters, and independent professionals, who use platforms as infrastructure to reach their audience without necessarily relying on traditional intermediaries in the cultural and media industry. According to Goldman Sachs Research, the ongoing growth of the creator economy will likely benefit companies (platform owners) that possess a combination of factors, including a large global user base, access to substantial capital, robust AI-powered recommendation engines, versatile monetization tools, comprehensive data analytics, and integrated e-commerce options. Examples of creator economy software platforms include YouTube, TikTok, Instagram, Facebook, Twitch, Spotify, Substack, OnlyFans and Patreon.

== History ==
The term "creator" was coined by YouTube in 2011 to be used instead of "YouTube star", an expression that at the time could only apply to famous individuals on the platform. The term has since become omnipresent and is used to describe anyone creating any form of online content.

A number of platforms such as TikTok, Snapchat, YouTube, and Facebook have set up funds with which to pay creators.

== Criticism ==
The large majority of content creators derive no monetary gain for their creations, with most of the benefits accruing to the platforms who can make significant revenues from their uploads. As few as 0.1% of creators are able to earn a living through their channels.

== See also ==
- Content creation
- Content intelligence
- Content marketing
- Creative economy
- Cultural technology
- Hype (marketing)
- Influence-for-hire
- Influencer marketing
- Social commerce
- Social media marketing
- Viral marketing
