= Customs4U =

Website for creating video clips about models

Micawber Systems Ltd (UK)
- Logo of Customs4U
- Traded as: Customs4U
- Industry: Streaming
- Founded: 2013
- Number of locations: London, England, U.K.
- Area served: Worldwide
- Website: customs4u.com

Customs4u is a custom online video portal featuring models from various countries who create customized, personalized video clips for customers and fans. The company was established in 2013 and is headquartered in London, England.

The service allows performers and models to own their own video content and control their own profits, rather than only working with studios.

Customs4U has established partnerships with several adult industry talent agencies and production studios, which have set up white-label websites for the adult performers they have under contract.
