= 9 to 5 (disambiguation) =

9 to 5, or working time, is the standard period of daily working hours for some employees.

9 to 5 or Nine to Five may also refer to:

== Film and television ==
- 9 to 5 (film), a 1980 American comedy film
  - 9 to 5 (soundtrack)
- 9 to 5 (TV series), a 1980s series based on the film
- 9 to 5 (musical), a 2008 musical based on the film
- 9 to 5: Days in Porn, a 2008 documentary film

== Music ==
- "9 to 5" (Dolly Parton song), 1980
- "9 to 5" (Sheena Easton song) or "Morning Train (9 to 5)" (1980)
- "9 to 5" (Lady Sovereign song), 2005
- Nin9 2 5ive, a 2004 album by Joey Yung
- "9 2 5", a song by Terror Jr from their 2019 EP Come Outside and Break Your Heart

== Other uses ==
- 9to5, or National Association of Working Women, an American organization
- 9to5 network, a group of tech blogs created by Seth Weintraub
  - 9to5Mac, an Apple news website
- 9 to 5, a comic strip by Harley Schwadron
- From 9 To 5, a comic strip by Jo Fischer
- Saab 9-5, a car
