= Griffin Johnson =

American social media influencer and venture capitalist (born 1999)

- Born: January 13, 1999 (age 27); Paris, Illinois
- Education: Indiana State University
- Occupations: Venture capitalist, social media influencer, former factory worker

Griffin Johnson (born 1999) is an American social media influencer and venture capitalist who began social media in 2019. He became a founding member of content creation house Sway House in 2020. In 2021, he founded a venture-capital fund, Animal Capitol. Since 2024, he has partnered with groups affiliated with horse racing to promote the sport. He has been described as one of the most influential figures in popularizing horse racing, and was named New Owner of the Year in 2025.

== Biography ==
Griffin Johnson was born on January 13, 1999, in Paris, Illinois. He stated that during high school, he "truly was a nobody". He attended Indiana State University, where he studied nursing. He worked as a part-time factory worker at a steel factory during college.

He began creating social media content in 2019, and soon went viral on social media. In 2020, he moved to Los Angeles to become a founding member of content-creating collective Sway House, known as the "bad boys of early TikTok" and described as like a frat house. Here, he created content and also participated in a cooking show.

He began getting involved in business by signing deals with music companies to promote songs through his reels, and went on to promote consumer packaged goods. That same year, he, along with the other members of Sway House, gave investor-focused Clubhouse chats to people including Bethenny Frankel and Mark Cuban on advertising to Gen Z.

In 2021, along with Josh Richards, he co-founded a venture capital fund, Animal Capital. The capital fund has invested in companies including Whop, Roblox, and Colossal Biosciences. He also personally invested in brands including Poppi. That same year, he acted in and produced a country club comedy feature film called Diamond in the Rough, alongside Samantha Boscarino.

In 2024, he partnered with America's Best Racing, where he received a percentage of equity in Sandman in exchange for creating content promoting horse races. He stated that "the bug caught" him when Sandman won the Arkansas Derby, where he took home about 20,000 dollars, but he also stated that "Horse racing, I don't think can ever be framed as profitable." He has stated a main reason for being involved as it being "a really good gateway opportunity for business" where "there's a lot of billionaires." He has since acquired equity in three other racehorses through similar deals as with Sandman.

He has emphasized creating a fandom around his specific horses, which was credited with creating a large amount buzz around Sandman as the horse competed in the Kentucky Derby. West Points Thoroughbreds founder Terry Finley stated "There's nobody in the history of our game that has had as much impact on generating interest as Griffin Johnson.", while Turf Publicists of America president Najja Thompson stated that "Griffin Johnson has helped grow horse racing by bringing our sport unprecedented exposure." He was named New Owner of the Year in 2025. According to IdolHorse, critics argued, however, that he was not a "real owner". He was also awarded the Big Sport of Turfdom Award that same year.

As of 2026, he had more than 12 million followers across social media, and primarily posted about horse racing. His content includes his own interactions with horses and watching the racing, including showing him washing and feeding Sandman.

He also co-launched CrossCheck Sports Management and Gen-Z marketing firm HawkeX with Richards. He is signed with ICM Partners.

== Personal life ==
He was previously in a relationship with Dixie D'Amelio. He has cited Kelly Osbourne as a mentor. He is currently in a relationship with fellow influencer Macy Broyles, and proposed to her on October 24, 2026.
