= OnlyFans =

British internet content subscription service

- Type: Private
- Industry: Online video platform; Paid subscription; Creator economy; Pornography
- Genre: Video on demand
- Founded: 2016 (10 years ago) in London, England
- Founder: Tim Stokely
- Headquarters: London, England
- Area served: Global
- Key people: Keily Blair (CEO)
- Services: OFTV
- Revenue: US$1.55 billion (FY2025)
- Owner: Estate of Leonid Radvinsky
- Number of employees: ~1,000 (2022)
- Parent: Fenix International Limited
- Website: onlyfans.com/about

OnlyFans is an Internet content paid subscription service based in London, England. The service is widely known for its popularity with pornographers, but it also hosts other content creators, including athletes, musicians, and comedians.

Content on the platform is user-generated and monetized via monthly subscriptions, tips, and pay-per-view. Creators are paid 80% of these fees and earn a yearly average of $1,300. In 2021, the company launched a free safe-for-work streaming platform, OFTV. OnlyFans grew in popularity during the COVID-19 pandemic. As of 2024, the site had more than four million registered creators and 370 million registered users.

In August 2021, a campaign to investigate the company began in the United States Congress, and it was reported that from October 2021 onward it would no longer allow sexually explicit material, due to pressure from banks that OnlyFans used for user payments. This decision was reversed six days later due to backlash from users and creators.

== Overview ==
OnlyFans is a British subscription-based video on demand service and social media network. It acts as a video hosting service, allowing content creators to upload videos and garner subscribers to their content. As such, it is part of the creator economy. Subscribers pay creators in monthly instalments, in one-time tips, or via pay-per-view. The company takes 20% of these fees.

OnlyFans is mainly used by pornographic creators, both amateur and professional, but it also has a market with other content creators—including chefs, fitness trainers, and musicians. A 2022 study published in the Archives of Sexual Behavior found that "OnlyFans users were predominantly white, married, males who identified as heterosexual, bisexual, or pansexual." The study found that OnlyFans users' sexual attitudes were not significantly different from those of the general population.

The company employs approximately 1,000 people, 80% of whom focus on content moderation and support. It had 2021 revenues of US$932 million. It is led by chief executive officer (CEO) Keily Blair and owned by Fenix International Limited, which was majority owned by Leonid Radvinsky until his death in March 2026. In January 2026, Radvinsky tried to sell 60% of the company for $8 billion, but found no buyer. He was in talks with Architect Capital for a deal valuing the company at $3.5 billion when he died. In May 2026, it was announced that the parent company of OnlyFans had sold a 16% stake of the business to Architect Capital for $535 million.

== History ==
=== Key figures ===
In November 2016, Tim Stokely founded OnlyFans as a platform for performers to "directly monetize their content and interactions". Stokely's start up capital was a £10,000 loan from his father, Guy Stokely. He had previously founded the websites GlamGirls and Customs4U. Tim's brother Thomas Stokely became the company's chief operating officer and their father assumed the position of finance head.

Initially, OnlyFans banned explicit content on its platform and sought to attract musicians and influencers. By 2017, OnlyFans lifted its ban on pornography. Two years later, businessman Leonid Radvinsky, owner of MyFreeCams, acquired 75% ownership of Fenix International Limited, the provider of OnlyFans, and became one of its directors. The Independent wrote that after this, OnlyFans "gained a pop culture reputation for being a hive of pornography". In December 2021, Tim Stokely announced that he would step down as CEO and Amrapali Gan would replace him. In July 2023, lawyer Keily Blair was appointed CEO.

=== 2020s growth ===
Amateur and professional sex workers drove OnlyFans' early growth, a process further accelerated by the COVID-19 pandemic and the recession it caused. Between March and April 2020, the user and creator base grew by 75%. The site grew rapidly after it was mentioned by Beyoncé in the remix of the Megan Thee Stallion song "Savage", released in April 2020. Traffic increased by 15% and Tim Stokely said about 200,000 new users and 6,000–8,000 new creators were registering daily. Celebrities including Cardi B, Rebecca Minkoff, and Tyler Posey, as well as media companies like Munchies joined the platform in 2020, further boosting interest in the site. By December 2020, OnlyFans had 85 million users and more than a million creators, generating more than US$2 billion in sales that year.

Sky News reported in 2020 that OnlyFans had not paid value-added tax for three years and could face heavy penalties from tax authorities; it began charging value-added tax in July 2020 after "discussions" with HM Revenue and Customs. By March 2021, OnlyFans' user base topped 120 million and creators collectively earned $3 billion in revenue. OnlyFans said it paid out more than $200 million a month to creators. In 2021, its revenue was around $900 million, a rise from $350 million in 2020, with the company reaching a market valuation of $1 billion. Radvinsky received $500 million in dividends in a roughly two-year period in 2021 to 2022. In April 2021, Time named OnlyFans on its Time 100 Most Influential Companies list. Also in 2021, Fast Company named OnlyFans one of the 10 most innovative social media companies. The Financial Times named OnlyFans one of the fastest-growing companies in Europe in 2022 and 2023.

As of May 2023, OnlyFans had 3 million registered creators and 220 million registered consumers. In 2023, creators earned an average of nearly $1,300 per year. In 2024, OnlyFans posted revenues of $1.3 billion in the year up to 30 November 2023, an increase of 20% over the previous year. OnlyFans also paid $150 million in UK corporation tax in 2023. In 2025, Reuters reported that Fenix International was in talks to sell the company to a Los Angeles–based investor group led by the Forest Road Company at a valuation of around $8 billion. In October 2025, OnlyFans announced that it had paid out $25 billion to creators since 2016.

On 23 March 2026, OnlyFans announced that Radvinsky had died of cancer at the age of 43. His majority stake was placed in a trust in 2024. Earlier in 2026, it was reported that there might be a sale of a majority stake to an investment firm. On 8 May 2026, the parent company of OnlyFans announced that they had sold a 16% stake of the business to Architect Capital for $535 million. The deal valued the business at $3.15 billion. OnlyFans said that the investment would allow them to "enhance the services it offers to creators and fans, streamline financial processes and better serve the creator economy, while maintaining its inclusive content policy and the success of its present operations".

In the year to November 2025, OnlyFans' parent company, Fenix International, reported revenue of $1.6 billion, an increase of 10% from the previous year, while pre-tax profit rose 5% to $715 million. Approximately $6.2 billion was paid to creators during the year.

In August 2026, the Financial Times reported that OnlyFans had paid $30 billion to creators since the platform was established in 2016.

As of 2026 OnlyFans has 37% net margin; in earnings per employee, it surpasses nVidia and Apple.

=== Restrictions on pornographic creators ===
Shortly after increased campaigning against OnlyFans due to concerns about child sexual abuse material, on 19 August 2021, the company announced that beginning on 1 October 2021 it would not allow sexually explicit content. The company pushed the update through a new Terms of Service Policy. The company would still have allowed nudity in some cases. The reason for this shift was initially reported to be pressure from credit card companies, including Mastercard, but CEO Tim Stokely later told Financial Times that it was due to withdrawn support from banks such as BNY Mellon and JPMorgan Chase, and that Mastercard had "no bearing on the decision". Stokely said that BNY Mellon had "flagged and rejected" each transaction from the company, and that Metro Bank had withdrawn support abruptly in 2019.

The decision was met with widespread backlash by creators and consumers of OnlyFans. Six days later, OnlyFans said it would reverse the decision and that adult content would be allowed on the site indefinitely, citing that it had "secured assurances necessary" to do so. The website Fansly surged in popularity as an alternative to OnlyFans for sex workers after the ban announcement. Fansly began operations in November 2020, and MEL Magazine has called its design and functionality "nearly identical" to OnlyFans.

In August 2022, a series of lawsuits were filed in the US alleging that OnlyFans had bribed employees of Meta to add Instagram accounts of OnlyFans creators who also sold content on OnlyFans' competitor websites to a terrorist blacklist. According to the lawsuits, adult performers including Alana Evans had traffic driven away from their Instagram accounts after being falsely tagged as terror-related, effectively shadow banning them and diminishing their ability to promote their content on rival websites. OnlyFans denied awareness of such activity. The plaintiffs withdrew the bribery claim in July 2023 and the case was dismissed in August 2023, with the court noting that it did not have jurisdiction over OnlyFans, which is based in the UK. In September 2024, Judge William Alsup ruled that the performers failed to show that Meta had interfered with their contracts or violated unfair competition law.

Content creators from Russia and Belarus reported that they were unable to withdraw their funds or were excluded from the platform as part of the economic sanctions following the 2022 Russian invasion of Ukraine. OnlyFans said this was because "worldwide financial restrictions ... limited methods to pay Creator accounts linked to Russia and Belarus". It later said it had restored full functionality to these accounts. On 21 April 2022, OnlyFans "temporarily paused" Russian creators' accounts.

=== Chatters and chatbots ===
In 2024, multiple investigative articles independently revealed that many creators relied on other people, called chatters, to impersonate the creator in messages with their subscribers despite promising direct connections on their OnlyFans profiles. One such article, by Reuters, reported that many creators also use chatbots for the same purpose. OnlyFans' terms of service explicitly prohibit chatbots and make creators legally responsible for any transaction with a subscriber. Two U.S. federal class-action lawsuits have been filed against the company, as well as against agencies employing the chatters, alleging that these practices defraud consumers.

=== United States visas ===
A January 2026 Financial Times report found that OnlyFans models and other social media influencers made up more than half of O-1 visa applicants, according to immigration attorneys.

== Safety and security ==
=== Child sexual abuse material ===
As part of the age and identity verification process, prospective creators must provide more than nine pieces of personally identifying information and documents before they can post content on OnlyFans. This includes full name, date of birth, bank account information, address, email address, valid government ID, a standalone selfie, a selfie while holding their photo ID, and social media handles. Depending on the country, Fans may have to provide various personally identifying information, confirmations, payment details, and documents to view media content on OnlyFans. In 2021, BBC News reported that it could circumvent the system. UK police criticised OnlyFans for not doing enough to protect children. Conversely, the country's government regulator, Ofcom, praised the site in 2022 for its use of third-party verification tools.

A 2020 BBC Three documentary alleged that a third of Twitter profiles globally advertising 'nudes4sale' (or similar) belonged to underage people, many of whom used OnlyFans to share their content. After an investigation, the BBC reported in May 2021 that OnlyFans was "failing to prevent underage users from selling and appearing in explicit videos". This included reports by UK Police, schools, and Childline. The National Center for Missing & Exploited Children reported under 100 instances of child sexual abuse material on OnlyFans per year, while MindGeek-owned companies accounted for around 13,000 cases, Twitter 65,000, and Facebook 20 million.

On 10 August 2021, US Representative Ann Wagner announced a bipartisan coalition pressuring the Department of Justice to investigate OnlyFans for child exploitation, citing increasing reports by law enforcement and child safety organizations that minors were being sold on OnlyFans, as well as instances of sex trafficking and image-based abuse. Over 100 members of Congress signed the petition. The Christian pressure group Exodus Cry and the National Center on Sexual Exploitation, founded as a Catholic organization, were cited as influencers in the campaign against the website.

Later that month, OnlyFans released its first transparency report about its safety compliance program. OnlyFans said it used machine learning classifiers to find child sexual abuse material (CSAM) and hashes to keep track of CSAM content, passing such information on to the National Center for Missing & Exploited Children (NCMEC). But in July 2021 it passed only one hash and details of 14 accounts, out of the 15 suspended for CSAM, on to the NCMEC. Gizmodo and The Verge called the report's figures unclear, saying they were limited to July 2021 and combined requests for data from law enforcement and from charity helplines.

In 2022, OnlyFans gave the Child Rescue Coalition $500,000 for a project intended to investigate adult online behavior that sexually threatens children. In 2023, it partnered with StopNCII.org, an online tool that uses a hash function system to prevent the spread of revenge porn and other non-consensual image sharing. Reuters documented 30 complaints from court and police records between December 2019 and June 2024 involving more than 200 explicit videos and images of children, including adults having oral sex with toddlers. Multiple videos of minors had allegedly been on OnlyFans for more than a year. In response, the Internet Watch Foundation (IWF) called the platform "an industry leader in online safety", while the National Center for Missing & Exploited Children (NCMEC) praised its participation in voluntary initiatives to detect and remove abusive content.

=== Data security ===
In February 2020, BuzzFeed News reported that up to four terabytes of hacked OnlyFans content went viral on social media. It supposedly came from hundreds of accounts and was spread on Mega cloud storage and Google Drive. OnlyFans denied that any breach had occurred. Daly Barnett, a technologist from the Electronic Frontier Foundation, told BuzzFeed News, "These platforms routinely have terrible security posture and reprehensible incident response." In August 2020, Forensic News reported that some content creators' accounts had been deleted without warning, leaving them unable to withdraw their balances. Radvinsky's previous business ventures were flagged by banks for indicators of money laundering.

=== Human trafficking ===
A house dubbed "OnlyFans House" in Bellevue, Washington was raided in June 2026 where women were forced to perform for OnlyFans streaming. The exploitation for OnlyFans video making purpose spanned across five properties. OnlyFans commented they have "robust boarding process" ensuring participants are 18 and over, though some of the women at the OnlyFans House were under 18. Suspect Nikita Tyukalo allegedly recruited women and took control over their OnlyFans account by locking them out, a strategy promoted by Andrew Tate — who Tyukalo frequently expressed agreement with on social media — in a video series called Pimping Hoes Degree. Tyukalo faces a number of charges for money laundering and human trafficking.

== Non-pornographic content ==
In March 2021, the company launched its creative fund to provide £20,000 grants to four emerging musicians in the United Kingdom, as selected by Stokely and Stefflon Don. Later that year, OnlyFans soft launched OFTV, an app and streaming site with a collection of its safe for work content. Floyd Mayweather Jr., DJ Khaled and Fat Joe, and Terrell Owens were among the new content creators during the year.

A second initiative, in 2022, was the OFTV program Creative Fund: Fashion Edition, a reality fashion show featuring designer Rebecca Minkoff. It was judged by Law Roach, Sir John, and Maeve Reilly; the winner received $50,000, and $25,000 was awarded to second and third place. A four-part Comedy Edition of the program in the U.K. and Ireland aired in 2023, with a similar prize fund. It was judged by London Hughes, Jamali Maddix and Mae Martin; Jack Guinness hosted and Sofie Hagen appeared.

In 2022, OFTV released Model Farmers, a reality television show hosted by Becky Houze. The show features celebrities working on a farm in the UK. Also in 2022, OnlyFans signed deals with the Sims family, who starred in the English reality television show The Only Way is Essex, and Whitney Cummings to star in OFTV shows to be released in 2023. Cummings also started an account on OnlyFans' main site.

== Individual creators ==
A trend on OnlyFans saw creators allowing free access to sexual content in exchange for proof of charity donations, beginning with Kaylen Ward raising US$1 million in contributions to charity during the Australian wild bushfires in Australia in January 2020. Bella Thorne broke OnlyFans earnings records when she joined the platform in August 2020, generating US$2 million in a week, including US$1 million in 24 hours. Thorne promised subscribers nude photos, but instead provided only photos in lingerie, leading to a large number of chargebacks. After the chargebacks, OnlyFans limited how much creators can charge and how quickly creators can receive their payouts, though the company said it was unrelated to Thorne and part of "an evolving process". Sex work advocates called Thorne a "tourist" in the sex work industry and blamed her for the policy change, saying it would cause them to lose a portion of their income. Thorne's record was broken in April 2021 by Bhad Bhabie, who garnered US$1 million in six hours. This led to criticism of Bhabie's subscribers, as her OnlyFans account launched shortly after she turned 18.

In May 2022, Carmen Electra joined the site, debuting her account with photos from her 50th birthday. The same year, Pennsylvania congressional candidate Alexandra Hunt joined the platform and announced that her campaign had raised around $100,000 in one month. In September 2022, the Twitch streamer Amouranth told Business Insider that she was earning $1.5 million monthly on the site and had grossed more than $27 million since joining in 2020. On 9 December 2022, YouTuber Markiplier launched an OnlyFans account page and the influx of traffic caused the site to crash.

== Restrictions and bans ==
In December 2024, China blocked access to the website.

== See also ==
- Bop House – Content creator collective in Florida
- Chatroulette – Chat website
- Fansly – American adult content subscription service
- Patreon – American crowdfunding website
- Pornhub – Canadian pornographic video-sharing website
