= Issa Twaimz =

American YouTuber and musician

Twaimz
- Born: Issa Christopher Tweimeh; May 13, 1995 (age 31); Hercules, California, US
- Occupations: Internet personality; Musician; YouTuber; Online comedian

YouTube information
- Channel: twaimz
- Subscribers: 4.39M
- Last updated: October 16, 2025

Issa Christopher Tweimeh, better known by his YouTube pseudonym Twaimz, is an American YouTuber and musician from Hercules, California. Formerly known on YouTube as Issa Twaimz, he is known for his humorous vlogs which often feature music. In addition to running his own channel, he is also a co-star of the Fullscreen series Party in the Back.

Tweimeh originally became famous for making videos on Vine. He first decided to become a YouTuber in 2013, after waiting in line for four hours to meet Shane Dawson at that year's VidCon. Dawson subsequently posted favorably about Tweimeh on social media, which inspired him to start making his own YouTube videos. He created his YouTube channel in April 2014, and within seven months, he had accumulated over 255,000 subscribers. His YouTube fame peaked in 2016, when he had over 2 million subscribers on YouTube, as well as millions more on Vine and Instagram. Despite this, it was around this time that he chose to take a hiatus from YouTube; as a result, he did not post any videos for over a year until August 30, 2017.

He soon announced a 20-city tour where he performed some of his original songs; the tour lasted from November 12 to December 17, 2017.

Twaimz is of Palestinian descent. He is gay.
