= 95th Squadron =

In military terms, 95th Squadron or 95 Squadron may refer to:

In the United States Air Force:

- 95th Fighter Squadron
- 95th Airlift Squadron
- 95th Reconnaissance Squadron

In the Royal Air Force:

- No. 95 Squadron RAF

== See also ==
- 95th Division (disambiguation)
