= 95th Regiment of Foot =

Six regiments of the British Army have been numbered the 95th Regiment of Foot:

- 1760–1763, 95th Regiment of Foot (Burton's) - Fought in the Anglo-Cherokee War, participated in the capture of Martinique, the occupation of Grenada, and the 1762 Battle of Havana
- 1779–1783, 95th Regiment of Foot (Reid's) - Participated in the Battle of Jersey in 1781
- 1794–1796, 95th Regiment of Foot (William Edmeston's) - Served on the Isle of Man, and at Dublin and Cape of Good Hope. Disbanded.
- 1803–1816, 95th Regiment of Foot (Rifles) - Formed 1800 as the Experimental Corps of Rifleman, renamed as the Rifle Brigade in 1816
- 1816–1818, 96th Regiment of Foot (1803) - Formed 1803, retitled 95th Regiment of Foot in 1816. Disbanded as 95th in 1818
- 1823–1881, 95th (Derbyshire) Regiment of Foot, raised in 1823. In 1881, during the Childers Reforms it was united with the 45th Regiment of Foot to form the Sherwood Foresters
