= 95th Regiment =

95th Regiment or 95th Infantry Regiment may refer to:

== Union Army (American Civil War) ==
- 95th Illinois Volunteer Infantry Regiment
- 95th Indiana Infantry Regiment
- 95th New York Volunteer Infantry
- 95th Ohio Infantry
- 95th Pennsylvania Infantry

== Other uses ==
- 95th Regiment of Foot (disambiguation), several units of the British Army
- 95th Russell's Infantry, a unit of the British Indian Army
- 95th Coast Artillery (United States)

== See also ==
- 95th Division (disambiguation)
