= Huddy (musician) =

American Internet celebrity (born 2002)

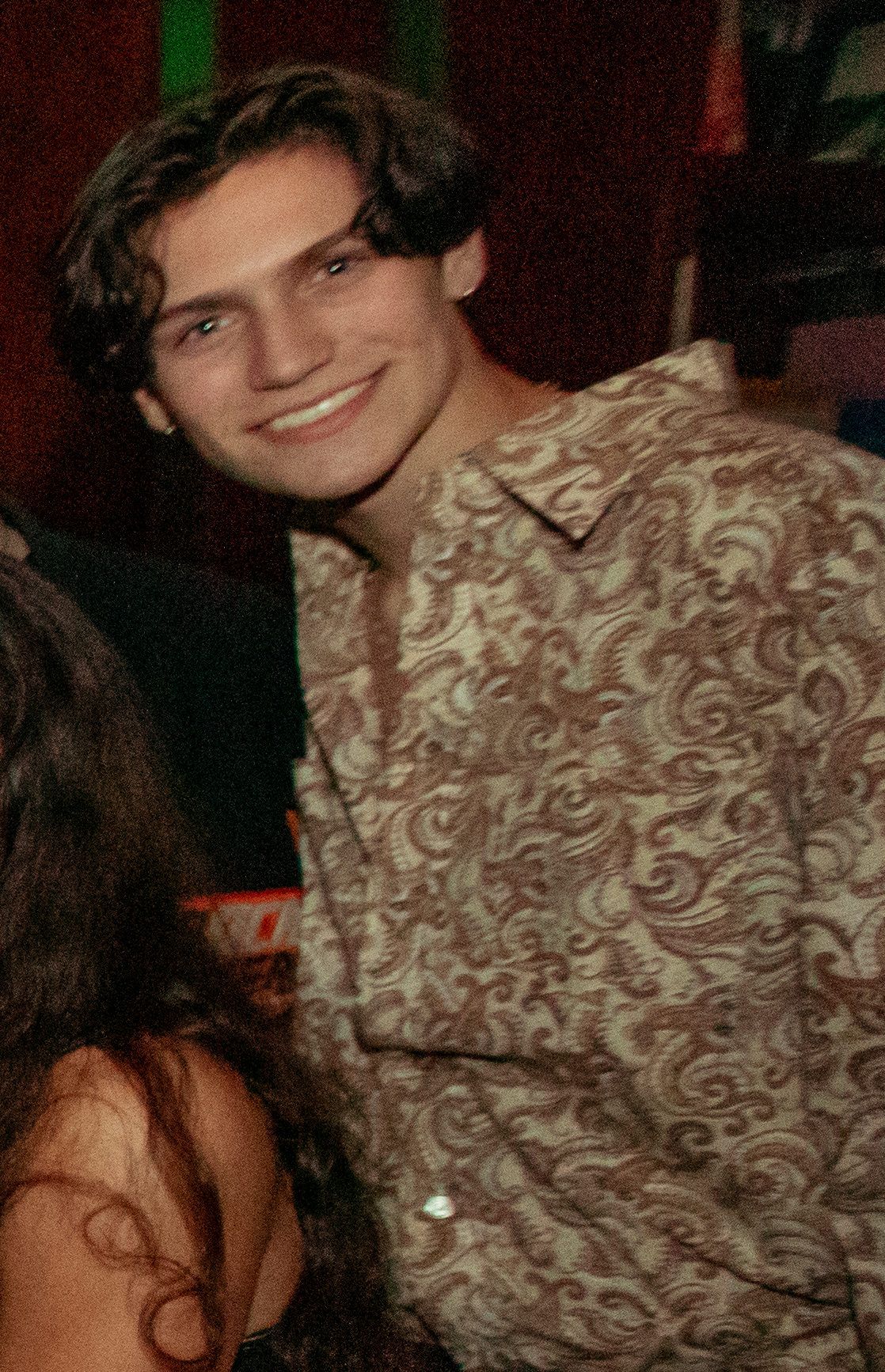
- Huddy in 2019
- Born: Cole Chase Hudson; May 15, 2002 (age 24); Stockton, California, U.S.
- Other name: LilHuddy
- Occupations: Social media personality, singer, actor
- Years active: 2019–present
- Known for: TikTok

YouTube information
- Channel: Chase Hudson
- Genre: Vlog
- Subscribers: 1.99 million
- Views: 89.48 million
- Musical career
- Genre: Pop-punk
- Instruments: Vocals; guitar
- Years active: 2021–present
- Labels: Immersive; Sandlot; Geffen; Interscope
- Website: huddyhq.com
- Last updated: August 4, 2025

Cole Chase Hudson (born May 15, 2002), known professionally as Huddy (formerly known as LilHuddy), is an American social media personality, singer, and actor known for co-founding the TikTok collective the Hype House and popularizing the e-boy fashion style and subculture. A 2020 article in Billboard Magazine rated him as one of the top 10 music influencers on TikTok that year, with over 30 million followers, and one of the most influential people on the platform. In 2026, he was a participant on the Fox series, Nation's Dumbest, where he won the titular title.

== Early life ==
Hudson was born in Stockton, California, to school teachers Cole Ellis and Tamora Hudson. He has two sisters. Growing up in Stockton, he became interested in fashion at a young age and discovering pop punk bands like My Chemical Romance, Blink-182 and Fall Out Boy from his older sister's iPod. In his teens, he began being bullied, which led to him becoming suicidal and eventually transferred to online schooling.

Hudson attended Bear Creek High School for his freshman and sophomore years, before moving to online schooling in order to continue his social media career. He graduated early in his junior year by taking three extra classes per semester.

== Career ==
Hudson began his career on musical.ly, now TikTok. In December 2019, Hudson co-founded the TikTok collective known as the Hype House with other social media personalities such as Daisy Keech, Alex Warren, Kouvr Annon, and Thomas Petrou. He also has a YouTube channel.

Hudson is represented by talent agency CAA.

In December 2020, he was signed to Interscope Records by Adam Mersel, despite Hudson only having a recorded "a few scrappy demos". Hudson starred alongside Sydney Sweeney in Downfalls High, the film adaptation of Machine Gun Kelly's album Tickets to My Downfall. The film premiered on January 15, 2021, and gained over 16 million views in its first weekend. He then released his debut hit single "21st Century Vampire" on January 21. On February 18 he released his second single "The Eulogy of You and Me", which was co-written and produced by Travis Barker. On April 22, 2021, he released his third single "America’s Sweetheart", an emotional ballad about a breakup and its outcomes. The music video features a cameo from internet celebrity and dancer, Charli D'Amelio. On August 6, he released the single "Don't Freak Out" featuring Iann Dior, Travis Barker and Tyson Ritter and announced his debut album Teenage Heartbreak which was then released on September 17, 2021.

== Influences ==
Hudson cites Justin Bieber, BTS, Shawn Mendes, Billie Eilish and One Direction as his fashion influences, and Travis Barker, Machine Gun Kelly, Olivia Rodrigo, My Chemical Romance and Blink-182 as his musical influences.

== Personal life ==
Hudson dated Canadian social media personality Cynthia Parker until their breakup in July 2019. He was in a relationship with TikTok influencer Charli D'Amelio between December 2019 and April 2020. They rekindled their relationship in 2021 but broke up in January 2022. He began dating model and social media influencer Chiara Hovland in February 2023.

Hudson faced backlash in December 2020 after it was revealed that he and a number of other social media personalities, had been vacationing at Atlantis Paradise Island in the Bahamas during the COVID-19 pandemic while cases in Los Angeles surged.

== Discography ==
=== Studio albums ===
List of studio albums, with release date and label shown
Title	Album details
Teenage Heartbreak	Released: September 17, 2021; Label: Immersive, Sandlot, Geffen; Formats: CD, cassette, digital download, streaming, vinyl

=== Singles ===
Title	Year	Peak chart positions				Album
Title	Year	US Rock	US Alt.	IRE	NZ Hot	Album
"21st Century Vampire"	2021	27	25	—	22	Teenage Heartbreak
"The Eulogy of You and Me"	2021	—	—	—	—	Teenage Heartbreak
"America's Sweetheart"	2021	—	—	—	24	Teenage Heartbreak
"Don't Freak Out" (featuring Iann Dior, Travis Barker and Tyson Ritter)	2021	46	—	—	36	Teenage Heartbreak
"Partycrasher"	2021	—	—	—	—	Teenage Heartbreak
"All the Things I Hate About You"	2022	17	12	92	8	Non-album singles
"Slowly Healing"	2023	—	—	—	—	Non-album singles
"Mugshot"	2024	—	—	—	—	Non-album singles
"21"	2024	—	—	—	—	Non-album singles
"Worst Way"	2024	—	—	—	—	Non-album singles
"Love Bites"	2024	—	—	—	—	Non-album singles
"Addicted to You"	2024	—	—	—	—	Non-album singles
"Cyanide"	2024	—	—	—	—	Non-album singles
"Vendetta"	2025	—	—	—	—	Non-album singles

== Filmography ==
=== Television ===
Year	Title	Role	Notes	Ref.
2022	Hype House	Himself	1 Season; 6 episodes	
2026	Nation's Dumbest	Himself	Season 1 "winner"	

=== Internet ===
Year	Title	Role	Ref.
2021	Downfalls High	Fenix	

=== Film ===
Year	Title	Role	Ref.
2026	How to Lose a Popularity Contest	Nate	

== Awards and nominations ==
Award	Year (Note: Indicates the year of ceremony. Each year is linked to the article about the awards held that year, wherever possible.)	Nominee(s)	Category	Result
iHeartRadio Music Awards	2021	Himself	Social Star Award	Nominated
