= Dixie D'Amelio =

American social media personality (born 2001)

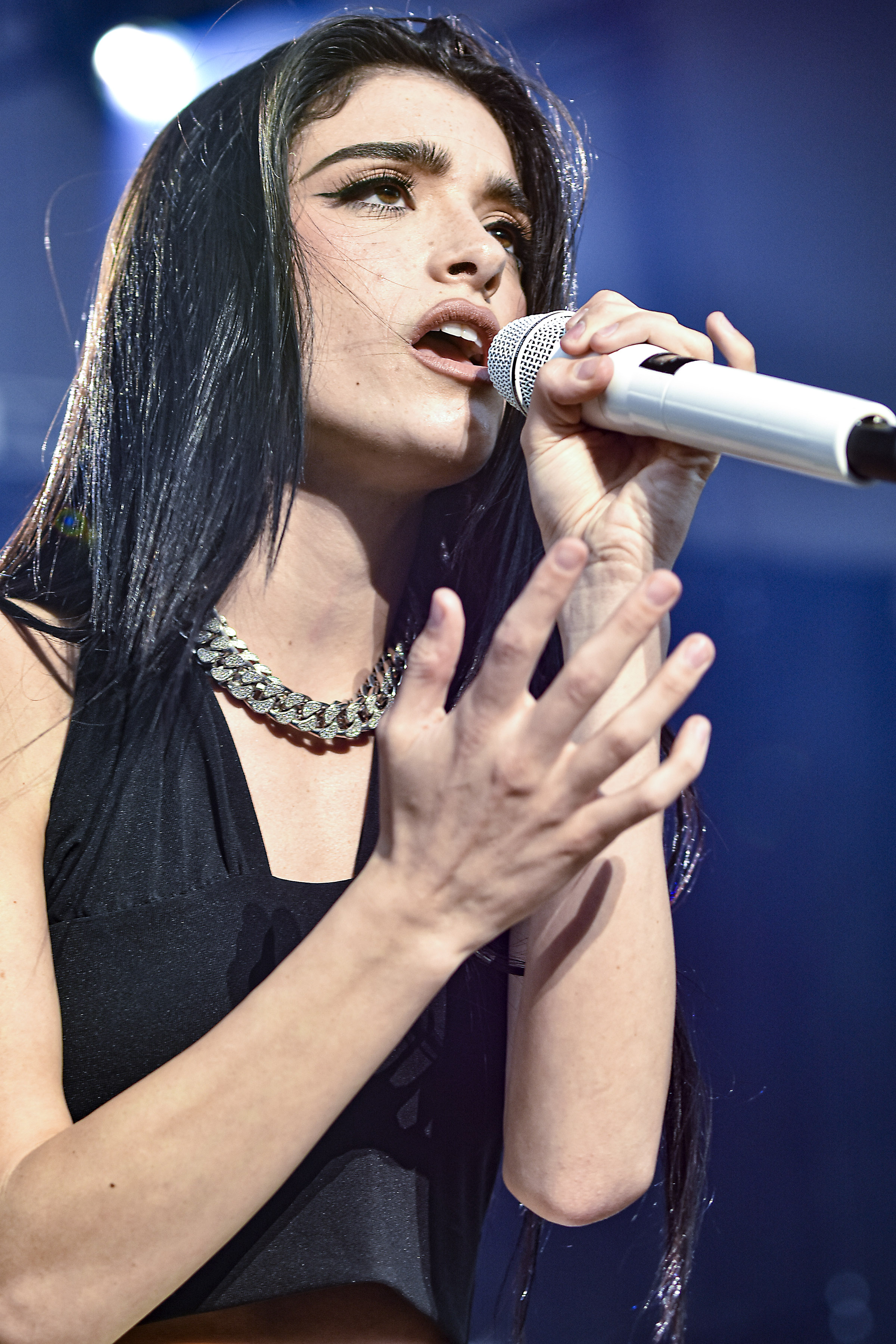
- D'Amelio performing at Huntington Bank Pavilion in 2022
- Born: Dixie Jane D'Amelio; August 12, 2001 (age 25); Stamford, Connecticut, U.S.
- Occupations: Social media personality; model; singer
- Years active: 2019–present
- Known for: TikTok; YouTube
- Relatives: Charli D'Amelio (sister)

Instagram information
- Page: dixiedamelio
- Followers: 18.6 million

TikTok information
- Page: dixiedamelio
- Followers: 53.6 million

YouTube information
- Channel: Dixie D'Amelio
- Genre: Vlog
- Subscribers: 6.35 million
- Last updated: October 20, 2026
- Website: dixiedamelio.com

Dixie Jane D'Amelio (/dəˈmɪlioʊ/ də-MIL-ee-oh; born August 12, 2001) is an American social media personality, singer, and model.

== Early life ==
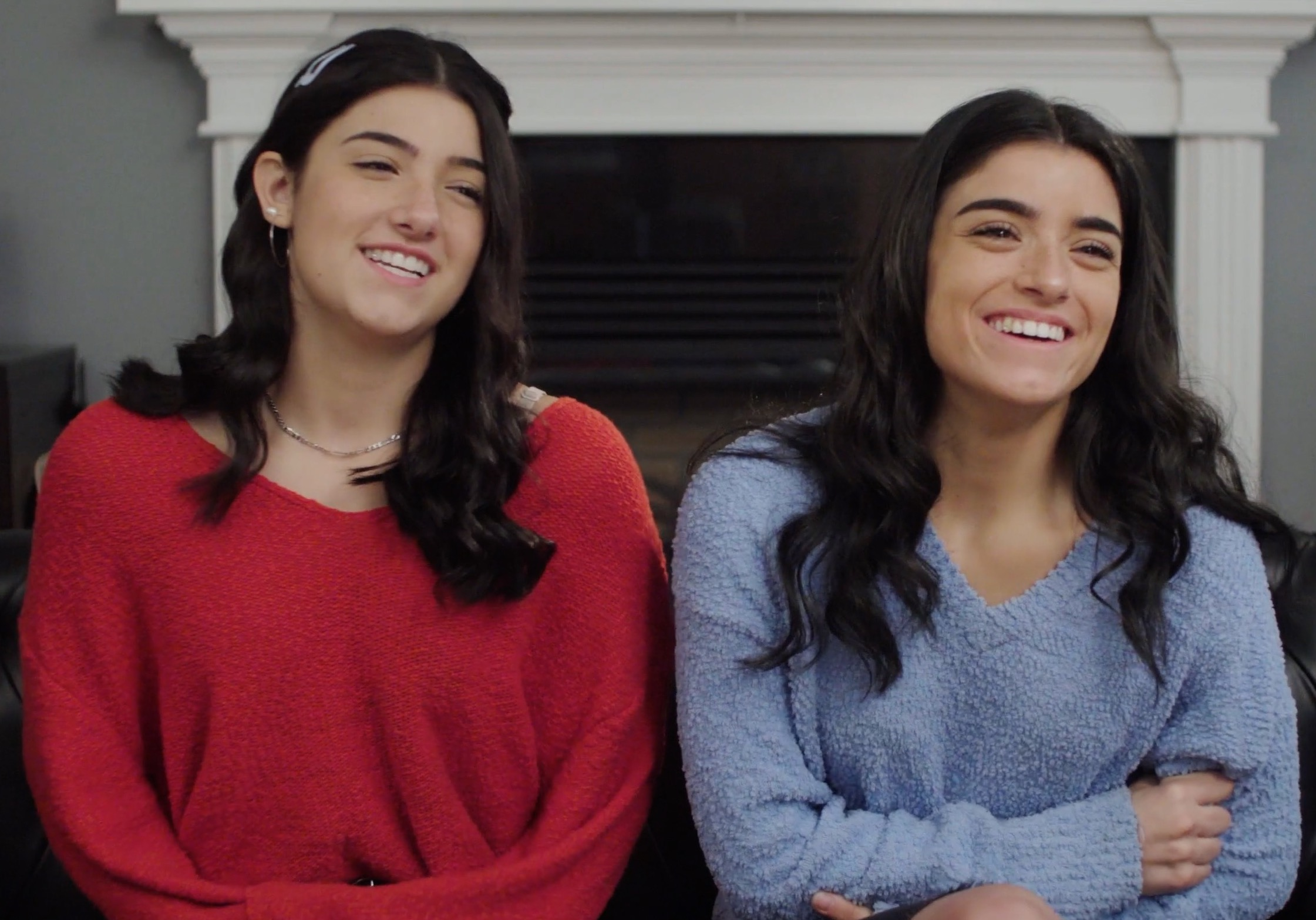
D'Amelio (right) with her sister Charli (left) in February 2020

Dixie Jane D'Amelio was born on August 12, 2001, in Stamford, Connecticut, to parents Marc and Heidi D'Amelio. She is the elder sister of fellow TikTok personality Charli D'Amelio.

== Career ==
=== 2019–2023: Rise on TikTok and music beginnings ===
D'Amelio's rise to prominence happened at the same time as her sister, Charli D'Amelio, both gaining popularity on TikTok. In January 2020, D'Amelio signed with United Talent Agency. In May 2020, she and her sister announced a new podcast deal with Ramble Podcast Network, which will offer a behind-the-scenes look at their lives and specific topics on their minds. This podcast was called 2 Chix. D'Amelio's acting career includes appearing on the Brat TV series Attaway General. On June 26, 2020, D'Amelio released her first single, "Be Happy". As of August 28, 2021, the song has accumulated more than 86 million streams on Spotify.

On August 7, 2020, she signed a record deal with L.A. Reid's label HitCo Entertainment. Forbes published a report in August 2020 revealing D'Amelio earned $2.9 million in the last year through June from her numerous sponsorship deals and merchandise, making her the third highest-earning TikTok star. In December 2020, D'Amelio released her singles "One Whole Day" with Wiz Khalifa and "Roommates", the latter of which was co-penned by Demi Lovato. "Psycho", featuring Kentucky rapper Rubi Rose, was released in 2021, peaking at 25 on the US pop charts.

D'Amelio released her debut album A Letter to Me on June 10, 2022. She performed as an opening act for American boy band Big Time Rush on the Forever Tour while promoting her debut album.

=== 2024–present: modeling ventures ===
In September 2024, D’Amelio attended Milan Fashion Week. In late 2024, she appeared in the campaign for Balenciaga's “Le City” bag.

In September 2025, D’Amelio signed with WME and IMG models.

In October 2025, D'Amelio attended Pierpaolo Piccioli's Balenciaga show in Paris.

== Personal life ==
In February 2020, D'Amelio started dating social media personality Griffin Johnson, though they broke up in July of that same year. In October of that same year, D'Amelio confirmed she was in a relationship with social media personality Noah Beck. D'Amelio and Beck broke up in late 2022.

In 2022, D'Amelio revealed she has PMDD.

== Filmography ==
Television roles
Year	Title	Role	Notes	Ref.
2020	Graduate Together: America Honors the High School Class of 2020	Herself	Television special	
2021	Earth Day! The Musical	Herself	Web special	
2021	Celebrity Family Feud	Herself	Contestant; Episode: "JoJo Siwa vs. Charli and Dixie D'Amelio and Ross Mathews vs. Loni Love" (season 8)	
2021–2023	The D'Amelio Show	Herself	Main role; Streaming docuseries	
2021–present	Charli Vs. Dixie	Herself	Co-lead; Web reality series	
2022	Hype House	Herself	Episode: “Glow Up”	
2023	Is It Cake?	Herself	Episode: "So Fresh and So Cake"	

Actress roles
Year	Title	Role	Notes
2020	Attaway General	Georgia	8 episodes

== Discography ==
=== Studio albums ===
List of studio albums, with details
Title	Album details
A Letter to Me	Released: June 10, 2022; Label: Hitco; Format: Digital download, streaming

=== Singles ===
List of singles, with selected chart positions
Title	Year	Peak chart positions							Certifications	Album
Title	Year	US Bub.	US Pop	CAN	IRE	NZ Hot	SCO	UK	Certifications	Album
"Be Happy" (solo or remix featuring Blackbear and Lil Mosey)	2020	1	36	56	34	8	59	55	RIAA: Gold	A Letter to Me
"Naughty List" (with Liam Payne)	2020	—	—	—	49	33	—	48		Non-album singles
"One Whole Day" (featuring Wiz Khalifa)	2020	—	—	—	—	8	—	—		Non-album singles
"Roommates"	2020	—	—	—	—	15	—	—		Non-album singles
"Fuckboy"	2021	—	—	—	—	16	—	—		Non-album singles
"Psycho" (featuring Rubi Rose)	2021	—	25	—	—	—	—	—		Non-album singles
"The Real Thing"	2021	—	—	—	—	—	—	—		Non-album singles
"Wild"	2022	—	—	—	—	—	—	—		A Letter to Me
"A Letter to Me"	2022	—	—	—	—	—	—	—		A Letter to Me
"Someone to Blame"	2022	—	—	—	—	—	—			A Letter to Me
"—" denotes releases that did not chart or were not released in that territory.

== Awards and nominations ==
List of awards and nominations received by Dixie D'Amelio
Year (Note: Indicates the year of ceremony. Each year is linked to the article about the awards held that year, wherever possible.)	Award	Category	Result	Ref.
2020	People's Choice Awards	The Social Star of 2020	Nominated	
2021	iHeartRadio Music Awards	Social Star Award	Nominated	
2021	MTV Millennial Awards	Global Creator	Nominated	
2022	Kids' Choice Awards	Favorite Social Music Star	Won	

== See also ==
- List of most-followed TikTok accounts
