= Hard Rock Stadium =

Multi-purpose stadium in Miami Gardens, Florida, U.S.

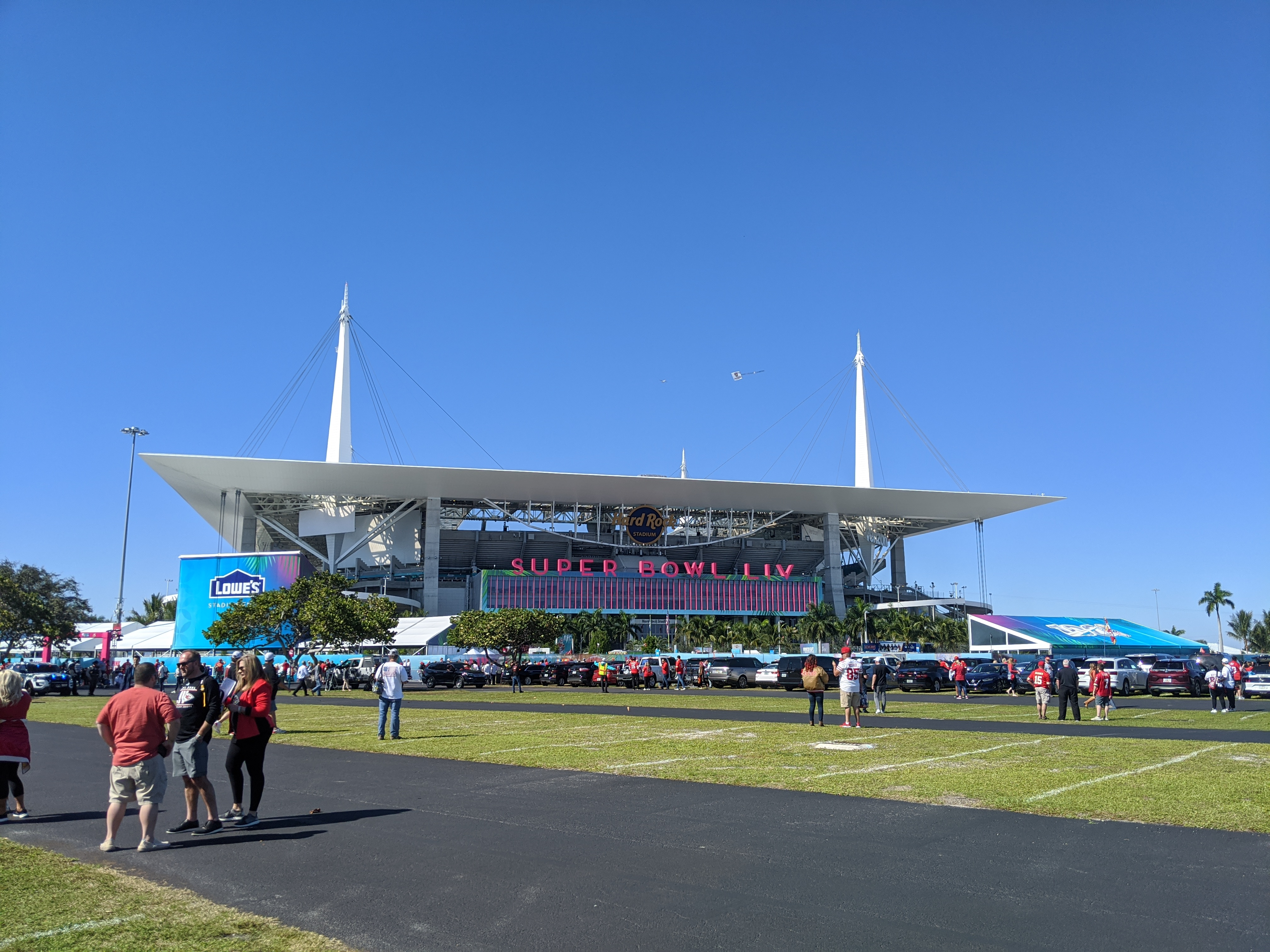
- Super Bowl LIV (February 2020)

- Location in Florida Location in the United States
- Former names: Joe Robbie Stadium (1987–1996); Pro Player Park (1996); Pro Player Stadium (1996–2005); Dolphins Stadium (2005–2006); Dolphin Stadium (2006–2009); Land Shark Stadium (2009–2010); Sun Life Stadium (2010–2016); New Miami Stadium (2016); Miami Stadium (2026 FIFA World Cup)
- Address: 347 Don Shula Drive
- Location: Miami Gardens, Florida, U.S.
- Coordinates: 25°57′29″N 80°14′20″W
- Owner: Stephen M. Ross
- Capacity: American Football: 64,767; Tennis: 14,000; Original: 75,000; 2026 FIFA World Cup: 64,478
- Surface: Tifway 419 Bermuda grass
- Record attendance: Football: 80,120 (2013 BCS National Championship Game) Baseball: 67,498 (1997 World Series Game 6)
- Parking: 26,718 cars

Construction
- Groundbreaking: December 1, 1985
- Opened: August 16, 1987; 39 years ago
- Cost: $115 million ($344 million in 2025)
- Architect: HOK Sport (now Populous)
- Project manager: George A. Fuller Company
- Structural engineers: Bliss & Nyitray Inc.
- Services engineer: Blum Consulting Engineers
- General contractor: Huber, Hunt & Nichols

Tenants
- Miami Dolphins (NFL) (1987–present); Blockbuster / Carquest / MicronPC / MicronPC.com Bowl (NCAA) (1990–2000); Florida Marlins (MLB) (1993–2011); Orange Bowl (NCAA) (1996–1998, 2000–present); Florida Atlantic Owls (NCAA) (2001–2002); Miami Hurricanes (NCAA) (2008–present); Miami Open (Tennis) (2019–present)

Website
- hardrockstadium.com

Hard Rock Stadium is a multi-purpose stadium in Miami Gardens, Florida, United States. The stadium is the home field for the Miami Dolphins of the National Football League (NFL) and the Miami Hurricanes, the University of Miami's NCAA Division I college football team.

The stadium has hosted six Super Bowls (XXIII, XXIX, XXXIII, XLI, XLIV, LIV), the 2010 Pro Bowl, two World Series (1997, 2003), four BCS National Championship Games (2001, 2005, 2009, 2013), two CFP National Championships (2021, 2026), one Copa América final (2024), the second round of the 2009 World Baseball Classic, and WrestleMania XXVIII.

In addition, the stadium hosts the Orange Bowl, an annual college football bowl game, and the Miami Open tennis tournament. Since 2022, the grounds of Hard Rock Stadium has also hosted the Miami International Autodrome, a temporary racing circuit used for Formula One's Miami Grand Prix. The stadium hosted multiple matches during the 2026 FIFA World Cup and hosted several matches at 2025 FIFA Club World Cup. It also hosted matches for the 2024 Copa América (including the final). From 1993 until 2011, the stadium also was the home field of the Florida Marlins of Major League Baseball (MLB) until their move to LoanDepot Park in 2012.

The facility opened in 1987 as Joe Robbie Stadium and has been known as the stadium of many names considering it has gone by a number of many different names since: Pro Player Park, Pro Player Stadium, Dolphins Stadium, Dolphin Stadium, Land Shark Stadium, and Sun Life Stadium. In August 2016, the team sold the naming rights to Hard Rock International for $250 million over 18 years; they will retain the naming rights until 2034.

== History ==
=== 1976–1987: Conception and construction ===
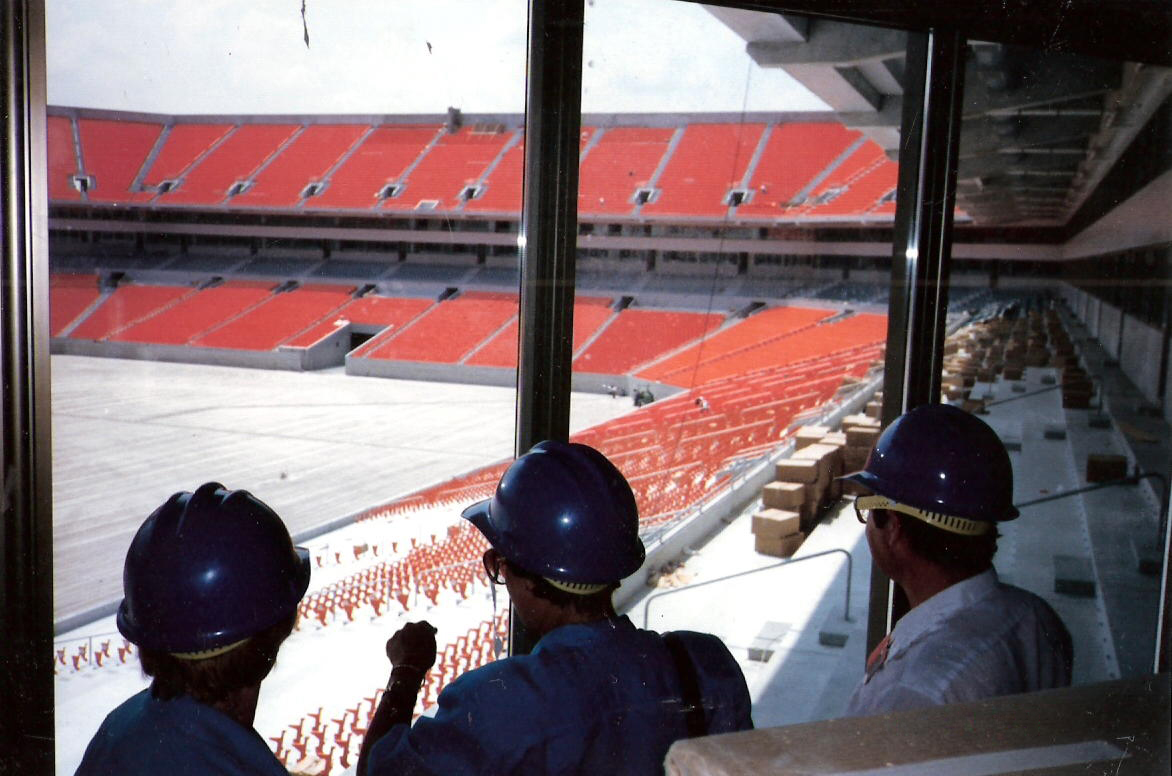
Joe Robbie Stadium during its construction in April 1987

For their first 21 seasons, the Miami Dolphins played at the Orange Bowl. Team founder Joe Robbie explained what led to the decision to build a new stadium: "In 1976, the city of Miami wanted to quadruple our rent. That did it. I began thinking in earnest about building a stadium." What made the construction of the stadium unique was that it was the first multipurpose stadium ever built in the United States that was entirely privately financed.

Robbie also believed it was only a matter of time before a Major League Baseball (MLB) team came to South Florida. At his request, the stadium was built in a rectangular configuration, with a field that was somewhat wider than was normally the case for an NFL stadium. The wide field also made it fairly easy to convert the stadium for soccer. Because of this design decision, the first row of seats was 90 ft (27 m) from the sideline in a football configuration, considerably more distant than the first row of seats in most football stadiums (the closest seats at the new Soldier Field, for instance, are 55 ft (17 m) from the sideline at the 50-yard line). This resulted in a less-intimate venue for football compared to other football facilities built around this time, as well as to the Orange Bowl.

At the time it opened in 1987, Joe Robbie Stadium was located in unincorporated Miami-Dade County, and had a Miami address. Specifically it was in the Scott Lake census-designated place. Today, it is located in the city of Miami Gardens, which was incorporated on May 13, 2003.

Widespread damage to the stadium was reported to have occurred during the 2024 Copa América final international soccer match which was held at Hard Rock Stadium on July 14, 2024.

=== Miami Dolphins ===
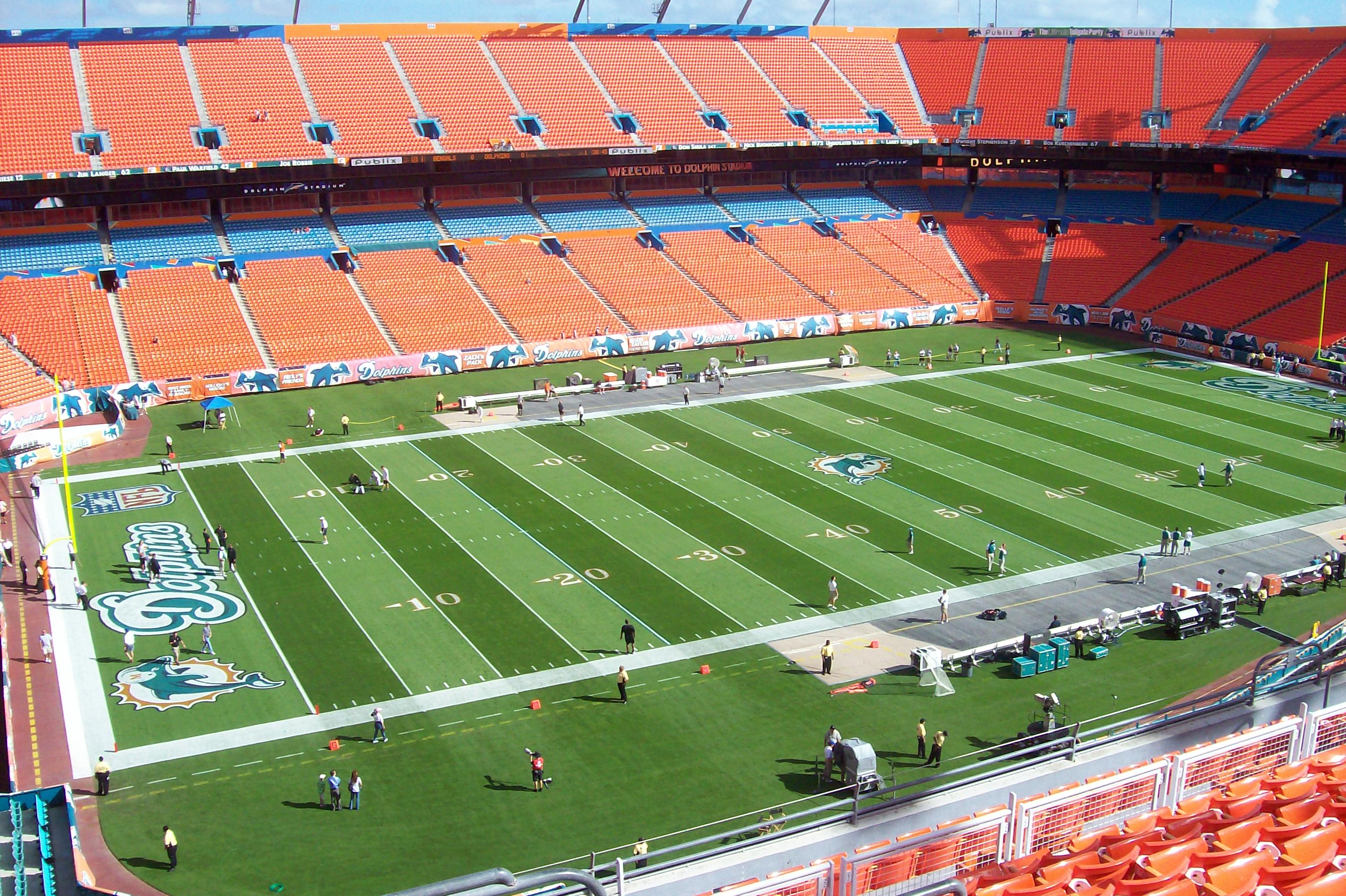
The stadium before a Miami Dolphins game against the Cincinnati Bengals in December 2007

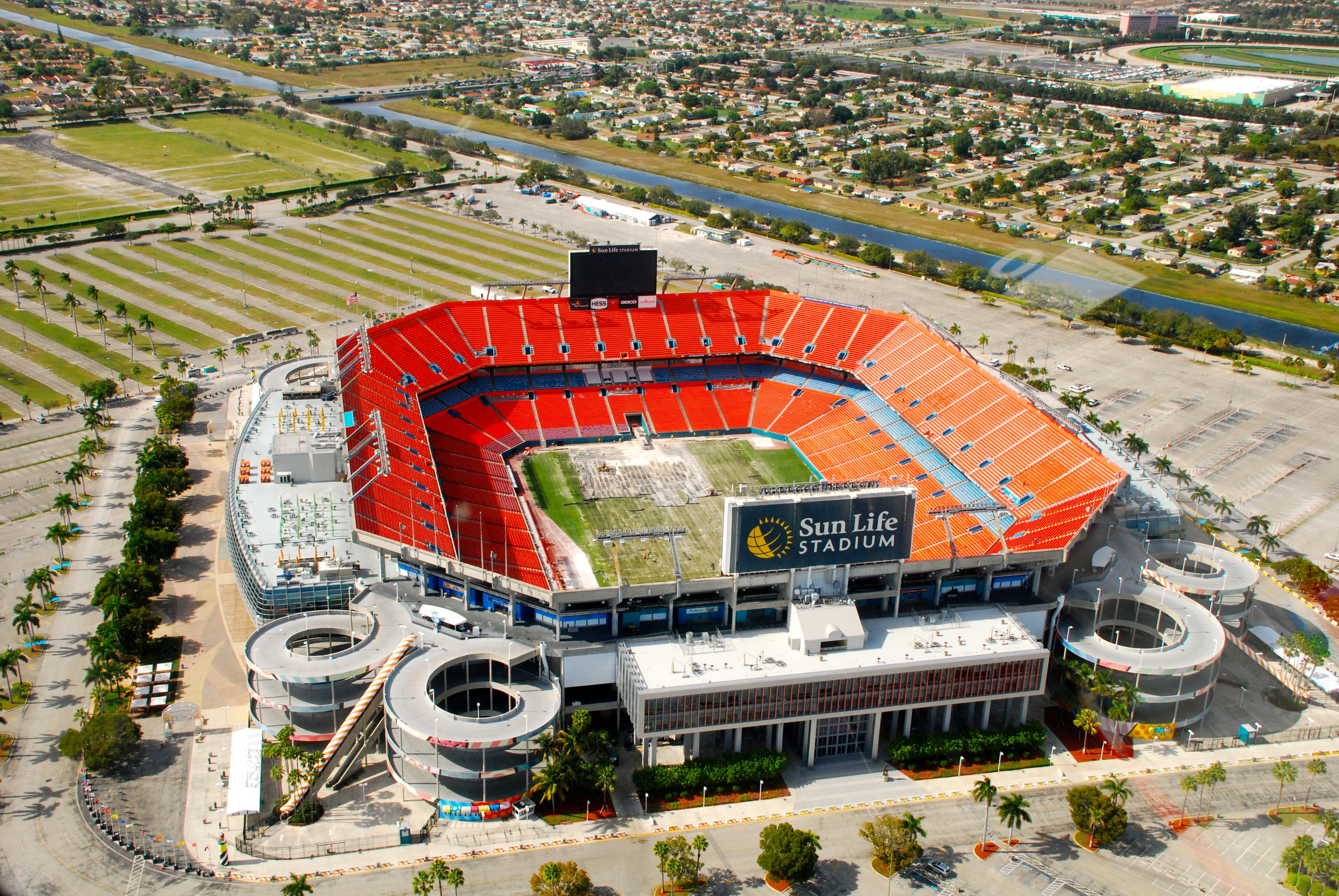
Aerial view of Sun Life Stadium in February 2012

The first preseason game for the Dolphins was played on August 16, 1987, against the Chicago Bears. The first regular season game was scheduled for September 27, a week 3 game against the New York Giants; this game was canceled and not made up due to the 1987 players strike. The first regular season NFL game played there was a 42–0 Dolphins victory over the Kansas City Chiefs on October 11, 1987. The game was in the middle of the 1987 NFL strike, and was played with replacement players. The first game with union players was on October 25 of that year, a 34–31 overtime loss to the Buffalo Bills. The stadium hosted its first Monday Night Football game on December 7 of that year, a 37–28 Dolphins victory over the New York Jets.

The Dolphins have played eight playoff games at the stadium, including the 1992 AFC Championship Game, which they lost to the Buffalo Bills 29–10. The Dolphins are 5–3 in playoff games held there, losing the most recent one in January 2009 against the Baltimore Ravens. Also of note, the stadium was host of the Miracle in Miami game against the New England Patriots in 2018, where the Dolphins scored a dramatic touchdown on the last play of the game to turn a deficit into a walk-off victory. The Dolphins have beaten every NFL team there at least once. The team is unbeaten there against the Los Angeles/St. Louis Rams (4–0).

=== Miami Hurricanes football ===
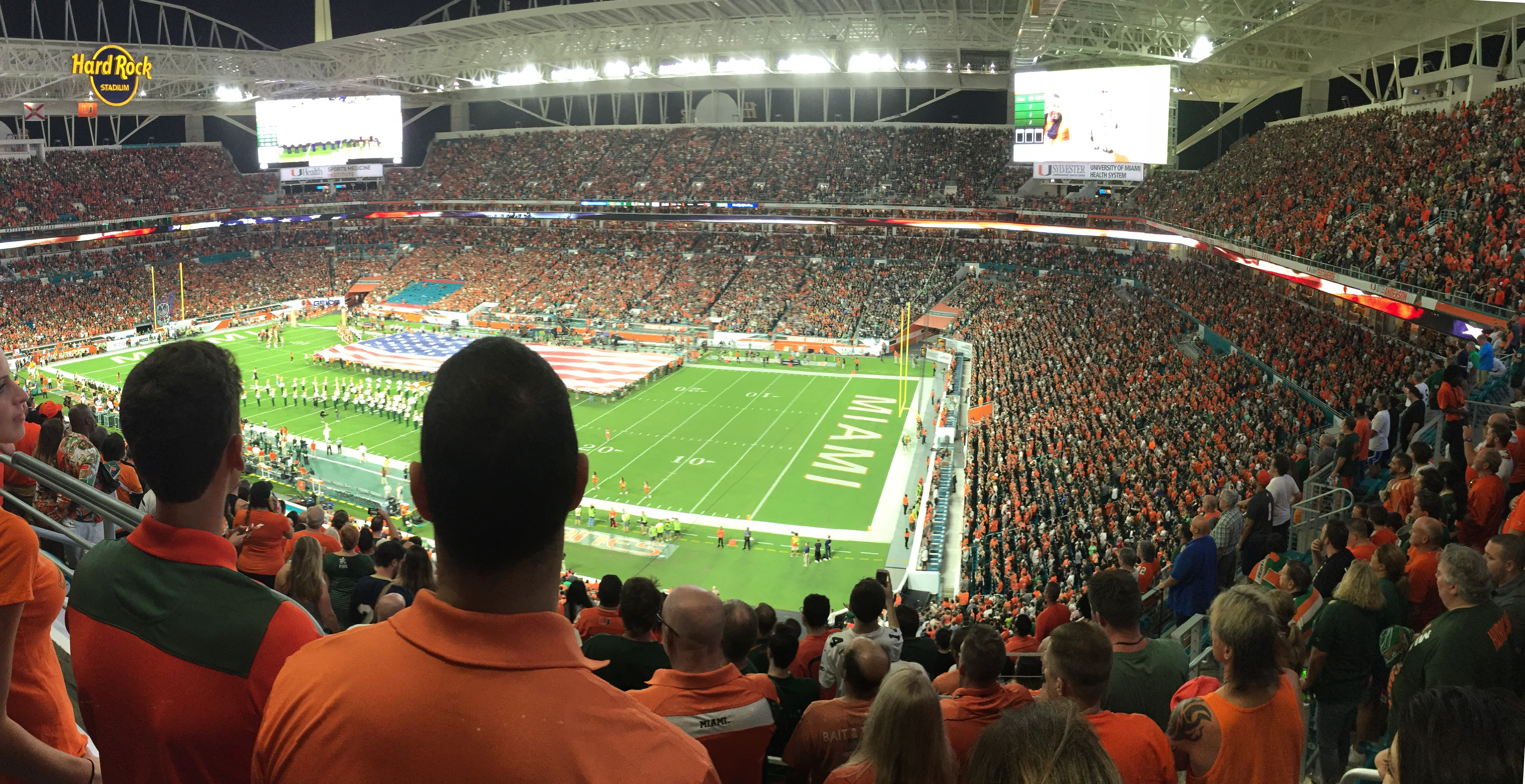
The stadium prior to a November 2017 game between the Miami Hurricanes and Notre Dame, won by the Hurricanes 41–8 before 65,303 fans

Since 2008, the stadium has served as the home field for the Miami Hurricanes college football team, a premier college football program that has won five national championships since 1983. The university signed a 25-year contract to play at Hard Rock Stadium through 2033.

Prior to their move to Hard Rock Stadium, from 1937 until 2008, the Miami Hurricanes played their home games at the Miami Orange Bowl.

=== 1993–2011: Florida Marlins ===
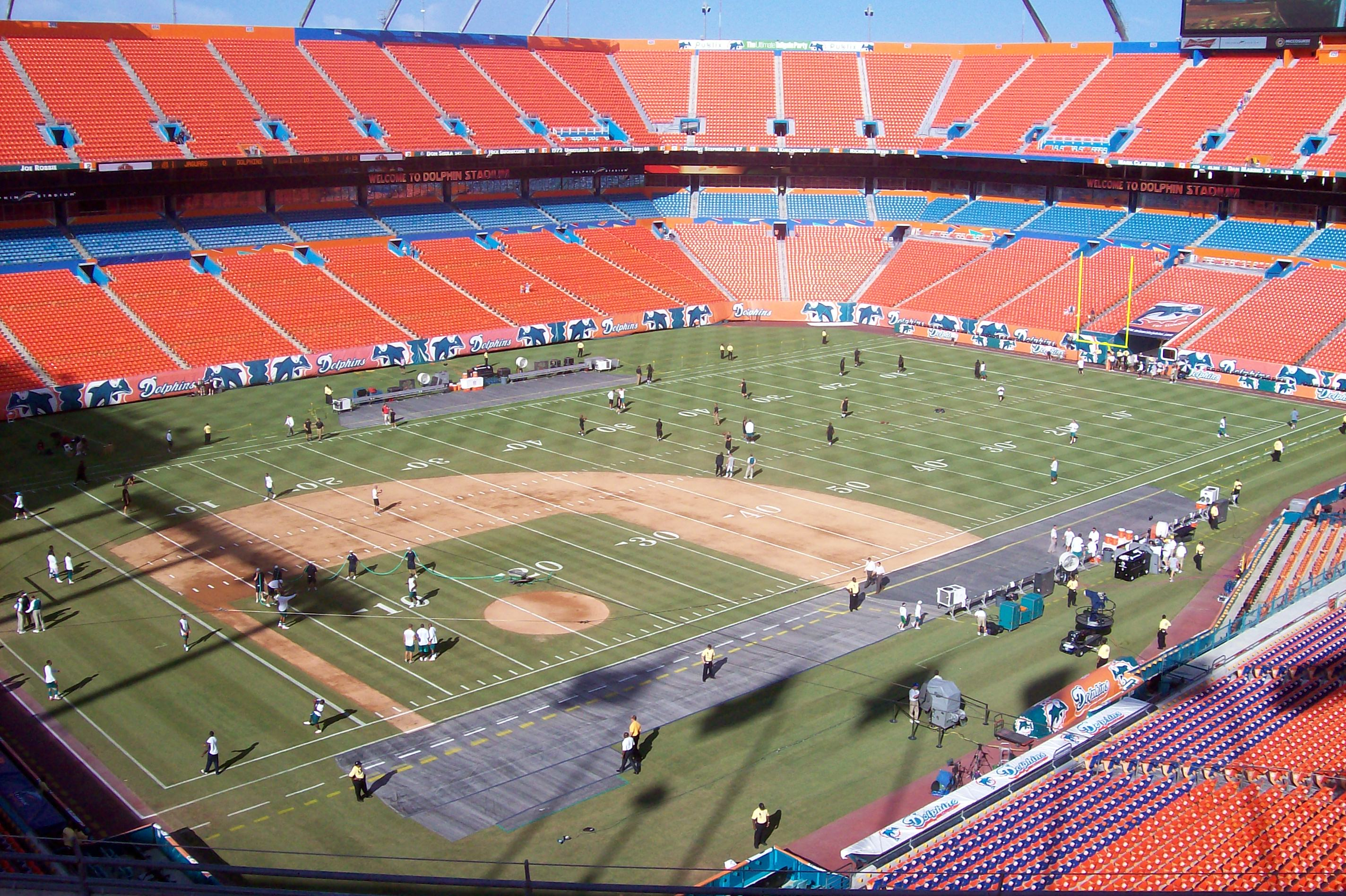
Dolphin Stadium shown prepping for a Miami Dolphins game with Florida Marlins baseball gridlines visible on the field in August 2007

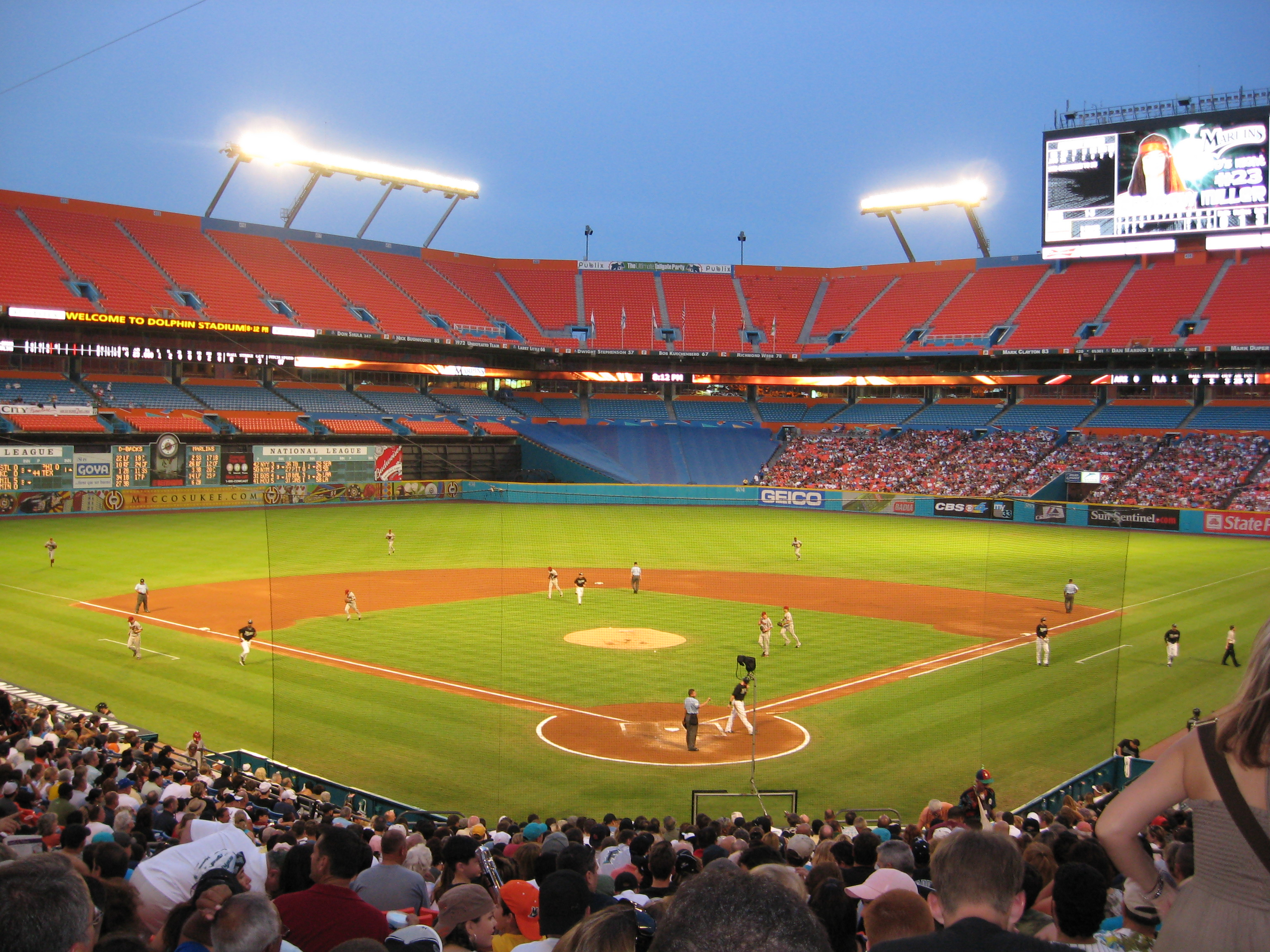
The stadium during a Florida Marlins game against the Arizona Diamondbacks in June 2008

From 1993 until 2011, the stadium served as the home field to the Florida Marlins of Major League Baseball.

While Joe Robbie Stadium was built primarily for football, it was also designed to easily accommodate baseball and soccer. Dolphins founder Joe Robbie believed it was a foregone conclusion that MLB would come to South Florida, so he wanted the stadium designed to make any necessary renovations for baseball as seamless as possible. In 1990, Wayne Huizenga purchased 50% of Joe Robbie Stadium and became the point man in the drive to bring Major League Baseball to South Florida. That effort was rewarded in July 1991, when the Miami area was awarded an MLB expansion franchise. The new team was named the Florida Marlins, and placed in the National League to begin play in 1993. Proposed 1994 FIFA World Cup matches could not be held at the stadium, as this June–July tournament conflicted directly with Marlins home games; Orlando's Citrus Bowl was used instead. The first Marlins game at Joe Robbie Stadium was played on April 5, 1993, a 6–3 victory over the Los Angeles Dodgers. The Marlins drew over three million people in their inaugural season, and went on to win two World Series titles in 1997 and 2003.

Despite such preparation and pockets of success, the stadium was less than adequate as a baseball venue. Although designed from the ground up to accommodate baseball, it was not a true multi-purpose stadium. Rather, it was a football stadium that could convert into a baseball stadium. There were plenty of reminders of this at Marlins games. The stadium's color scheme matched that of the Dolphins. When the football season overlapped, cleat marks, as well as silhouettes of hashmarks and logos of the Dolphins or Hurricanes, were visible on the baseball diamond. During football games, the infield dirt was visible on the gridiron. The Marlins reduced capacity to 47,662 (later to 35,521), mainly to create a more intimate atmosphere for baseball. However, capacity would have likely been reduced in any event, since many of the seats in the upper deck were too far from the field to be of any use during the regular season. Even with the reduced capacity, the sight lines were less than optimal for baseball. Most seats were pointed toward the 50-yard line—where center field was located in the baseball configuration. Lights were not angled for optimum baseball visibility. Players had to walk through football tunnels to get to dugouts that were designed with low ceiling joists. Some of these issues were showcased on national television during the two World Series held there, when capacity was expanded to over 67,000. Most notably, some areas of left and center field were not part of the football playing field, and fans sitting in the left-field upper deck could not see any game action in those areas except on the replay boards. These issues became even more pronounced over the years, as, by 2004, a wave of baseball-only parks left what had by then been renamed Pro Player Stadium as the only National League park that played host to both an MLB and an NFL team.

Additionally, the stadium was built for games held during the fall/winter football season, not for games in the tropical summers of South Florida, which feature oppressive heat, humidity, frequent rain, and occasional tropical storms. For most of the stadium's run as a baseball venue, it was the hottest stadium in the majors, with temperatures for day games frequently reaching well above 95 °F (35 °C). The Marlins played most of their summer home games at night as a result. The lack of refuge from the uncomfortable climate and disruptive rain delays were considered a cause of chronically low attendance after that inaugural season. When the Marlins were not contending, they struggled to attract crowds larger than 5,000, a figure that looked even smaller than that due to the cavernous environment. Some Marlins players later admitted that they "couldn't wait to go on the road" because Sun Life Stadium (as their home had been renamed in 2010) had the "worst [playing] conditions" and least fan energy in the majors during years when the team was not a contender.

=== 2012–2015: Baseball renovations and configurations ===
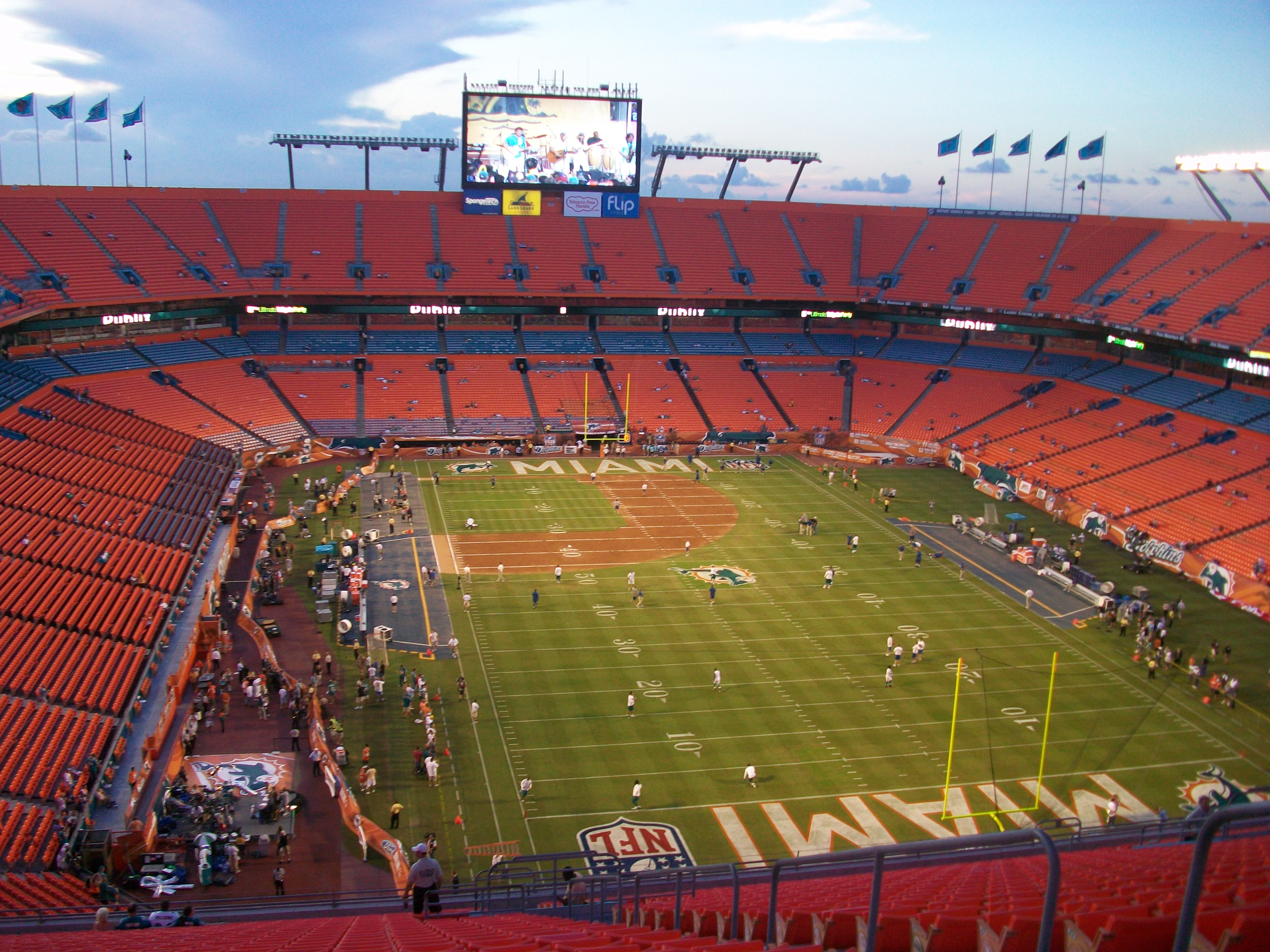
The interior of Land Shark Stadium in September 2009 when the Florida Marlins, Miami Dolphins, and Miami Hurricanes were all playing there simultaneously prior to the Marlins' 2012 move to LoanDepot Park

After Huizenga bought part of the stadium, it was extensively renovated to accommodate a baseball team at the cost of several million dollars, as part of his successful bid to bring baseball to South Florida. Purists initially feared the result would be similar to Exhibition Stadium in Toronto; when the Toronto Blue Jays played there from 1977 to 1989, they were burdened with seats that were so far from the field (over 800 feet in some cases) that they were not even sold during the regular season. However, as Robbie foresaw Miami as a likely location for an MLB team, the stadium was designed to make any necessary changes for baseball as seamless as possible. On January 24, 1994, soon after buying the Dolphins, Huizenga acquired the remaining 50% of the stadium.

Aside from baseball renovations, the stadium underwent some permanent renovations. In April 2006, the stadium unveiled two Daktronics large video boards, the largest in professional sports at the time. The east display measured 50 ft (15 m) high by 140 ft (43 m) wide, and the west end zone display measured 50 ft (15 m) high by 100 ft (30 m) wide. A new 2,118-foot (646 m)-long LED ribbon board, again the largest in the world at the time, was also installed. These have since been surpassed in size.

In addition, the upgrades included vastly widened 40,000-square-foot (3,700 m^{2}) concourses on the stadium's north and south sides. Bars, lounges and other amenities were also added. The renovation had three phases, with the second and third phases of renovation taking place after the Marlins left the stadium. These remaining phases included adding a canopy to shield fans from the rain, which caused the relocation of the video boards to the corners of the upper deck, as well as narrowing the sidelines by bringing the seats closer to the field, ending its convertibility to baseball. The orange colored seats were also replaced with aqua colored ones.

=== 2015 renovation ===
The Marlins left for their own stadium, Marlins Park (now LoanDepot Park), which was completed for the 2012 MLB season.

A privately funded $350 million stadium renovation project began in January 2015, after the 2014 Orange Bowl. The project plan allowed the stadium to be used for football games during the 2015 NFL season, and was completed for the 2016 season. Stadium upgrades included video boards in each corner of the stadium, additional suites, and an open-air canopy over the main seating areas. As part of the renovation, the stadium's seating capacity was reduced from 75,000 to 65,000 seats. Personal seat licenses were not used, and a preview center opened at the stadium in February 2015 to help current and prospective season ticket holders select their ticket packages. Luxury packages were used in place of PSL revenue to help finance the stadium. Thirty-two four-seat pods were installed located in the lower bowl at the south 30-yard lines, with an additional 16 pods at the south end zone. The pods feature a living room arrangement, including premium furniture and television screens that show the NFL RedZone channel and NFL programming.

By coincidence of the roof's design, the Dolphins bench remains in the full shade of its shadow on the sideline during game days, leaving the visiting team's bench uncovered and fully bathed in sunlight, especially notable as the Dolphins usually choose to wear their white jerseys at home outside special uniforms, leaving the away team in darker jerseys in the tropical climate of Miami Gardens.

=== Tennis ===
In November 2017, the Miami Open tennis tournament announced that it would move from Crandon Park in Key Biscayne to Hard Rock Stadium in 2019. Its organizers had pursued a $50 million refurbishment of the aging facility, including the addition of three permanent stadium courts. However, the family who originally owned the land filed a lawsuit that blocked their construction, as their agreement to donate the site to Miami-Dade County in 1992 contained a stipulation that only one stadium may be built on the site.

To host the tournament, 29 permanent courts (including 11 tournament courts, with one being a 4,993-seat grandstand court) were built on Hard Rock Stadium's south parking lots. The stadium proper serves as center court, using a modified, 13,800-seat configuration with temporary grandstands constructed on the playing surface, placing the court roughly between the two 30-yard lines. The move to Hard Rock Stadium was praised by players and fans because of the ample space the complex provides.

In January 2020, the stadium opened the SkyView gondola, which runs at the south side of the stadium complex and provides views of the grounds and the Miami skyline.

=== Seating capacity ===
Football
Years	Capacity
1987–1988	74,993
1989–1992	73,000
1993–1997	74,916
1998–2001	75,192
2002–2014	75,540
2015–present	64,767

Baseball
Years	Capacity
1993	43,909
1994	47,662
1995	46,238
1996–1997	41,855
1998	42,531
1999	35,521
2000–2007	36,331
2008–2011	38,560

=== Permanent seating ===
The 65,326 permanent seats for football and soccer configurations break down as follows: for the general 19-inch (48 cm) seats with chair back and armrests, there are 27,397 in the lower deck and 34,736 in the upper deck. There are 10,209 of the bigger club 21-inch (53 cm) seats with chair back and armrests. In the 193 executive suites with 10, 12, 16, 20, and 24 seats, there are a total of 3,198. There are also 300 accessible seating locations for spectators with disabilities, 150 seats for working press, and 10 radio/TV booths.

== Events ==
=== NFL ===
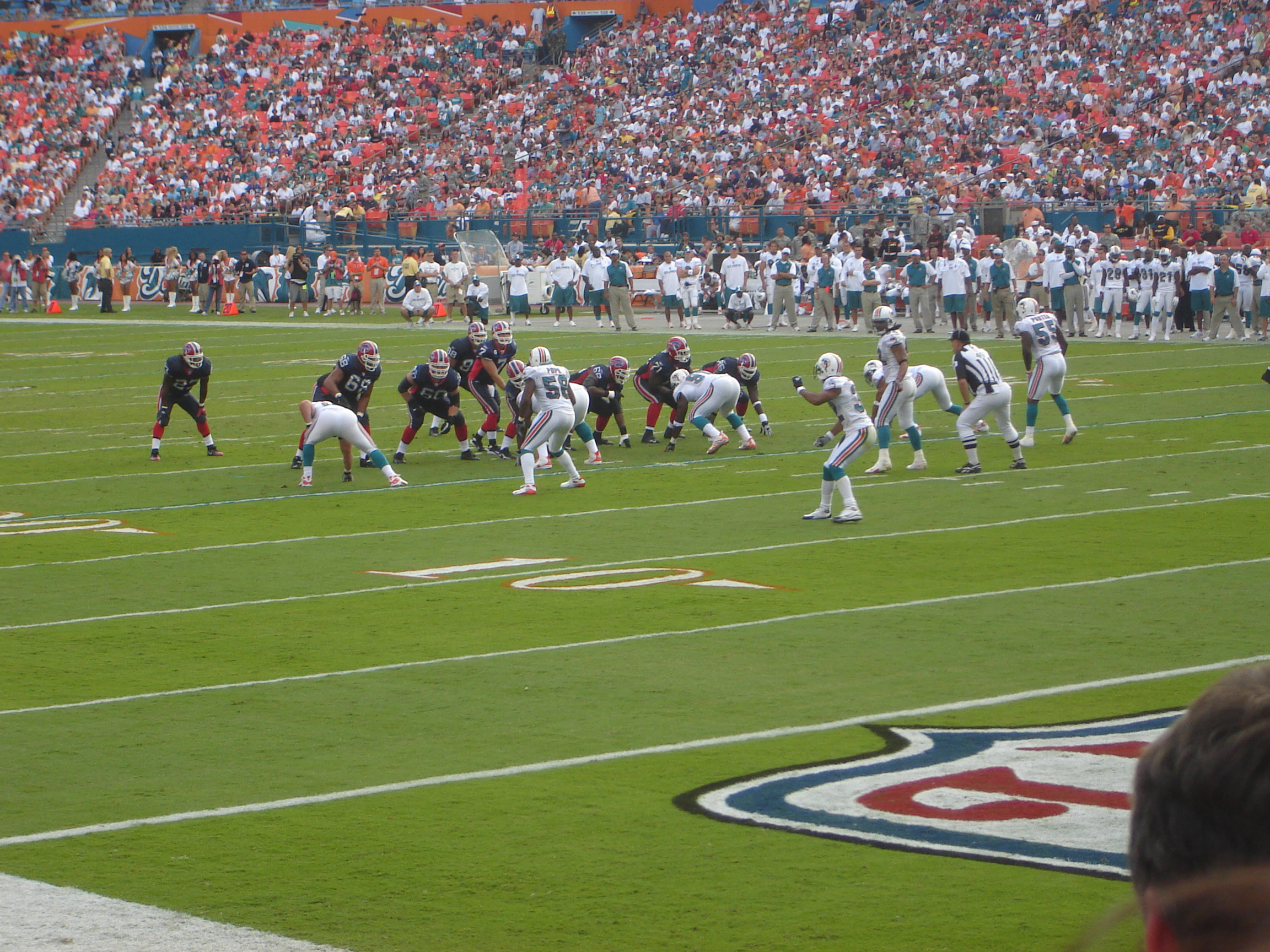
The Miami Dolphins hosting the Buffalo Bills at the stadium in November 2007

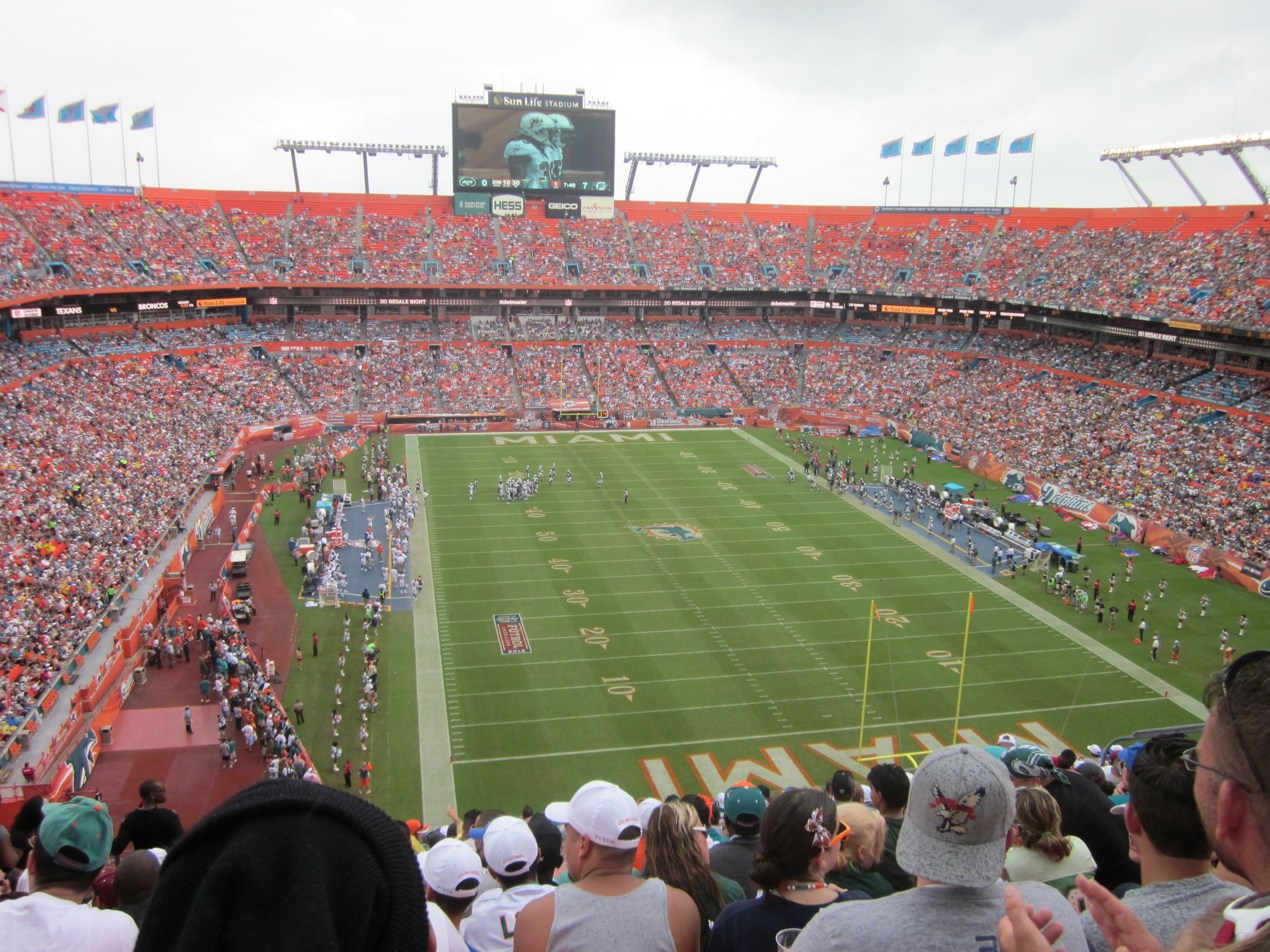
The Miami Dolphins hosting the New York Jets at the stadium in September 2012

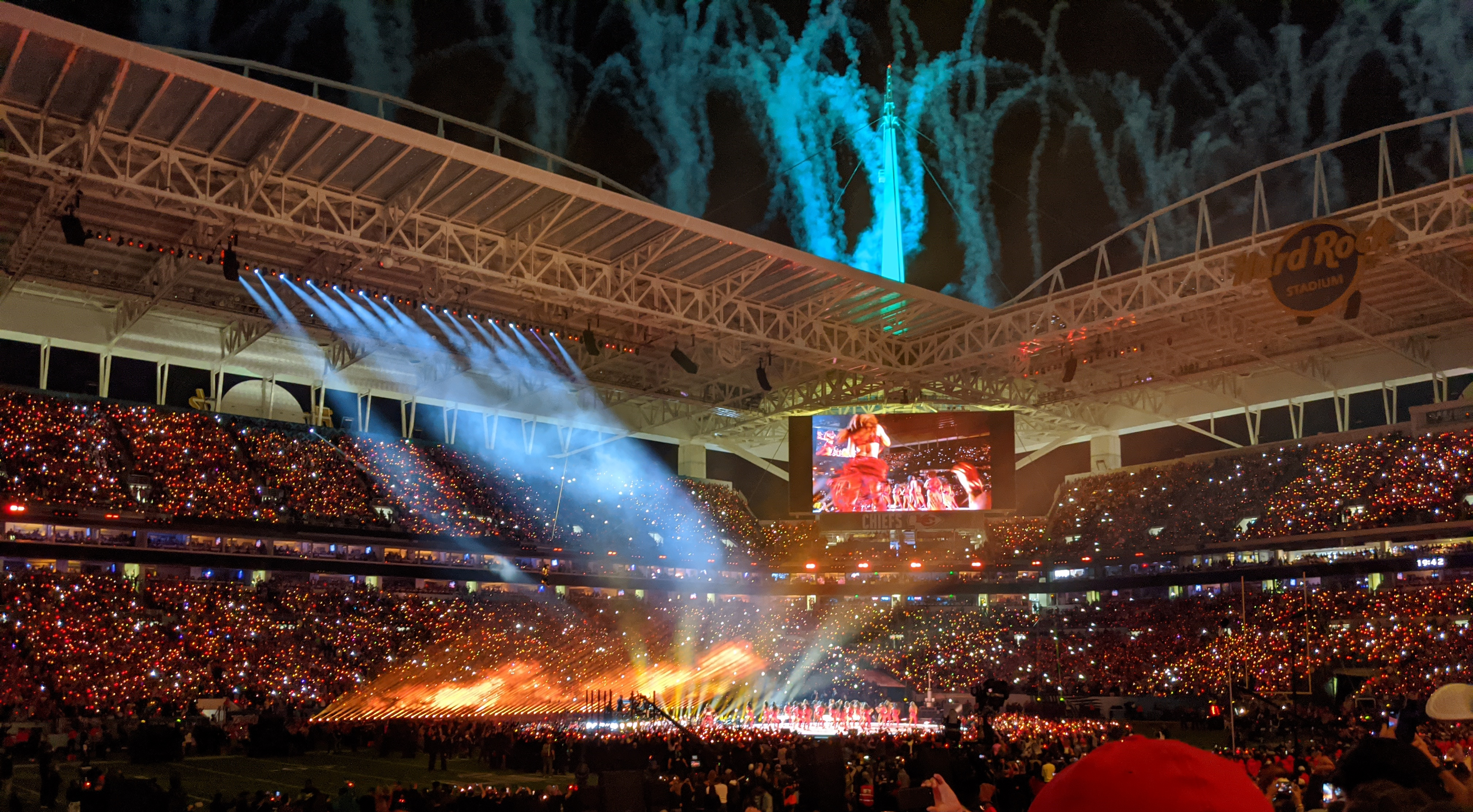
Jennifer Lopez and Shakira performing in the Super Bowl LIV halftime show at the stadium in February 2020

The stadium has played host to six Super Bowls (XXIII, XXIX, XXXIII, XLI, XLIV, and LIV) and also hosted the 2010 Pro Bowl.

Super Bowl XLI in 2007 at Dolphin Stadium, when the Indianapolis Colts defeated the Chicago Bears 29–17, was marred by heavy rains. An estimated 30% of the lower-level seating was empty during the second half.

In 2010, the NFL threatened to take the stadium out of further consideration for a Super Bowl or Pro Bowl unless significant renovations were made. One of the upgrades desired was a roof to protect fans from the elements. In 2012, the Dolphins scrapped plans for pitching a $200 million hotel tax proposal that would have included a partial stadium roof.

In 2016, an open-air canopy was constructed that protects the seating bowl from the elements. The canopy, however, does have a football-field-sized hole in the middle, and thus does not protect the playing field itself from rain. The renovations were completed by the first Miami Dolphins pre-season home game in September 2016.

Previously, since the field runs east–west (rather than north–south, as is the case in most other stadiums), the north stands were exposed to the full force of South Florida's oppressive heat early in the season. The issue became so problematic that Stephen Ross, who owned the Dolphins and the stadium, successfully petitioned the NFL to have all September home games start at or after 4 pm. Ross knew that for much of September, the Dolphins had a substantial home-field advantage against opponents unaccustomed to the sweltering heat. However, he was willing to give that up in order to ensure a more comfortable environment for fans.

In 2021, the team opened the Baptist Health Training Complex at the west side of the Stadium complex. The Dolphins permanently moved to the state-of-the art facility that hosts the team headquarters including two outdoor practice fields and one indoor field.

Date	Super Bowl	Team (Visitor)		Team (Home)		Spectators
January 22, 1989	XXIII	Cincinnati Bengals	16	San Francisco 49ers	20	75,597
January 29, 1995	XXIX	San Diego Chargers	26	San Francisco 49ers	49	74,107
January 31, 1999	XXXIII	Denver Broncos	34	Atlanta Falcons	19	74,803
February 4, 2007	XLI	Indianapolis Colts	29	Chicago Bears	17	74,512
February 7, 2010	XLIV	New Orleans Saints	31	Indianapolis Colts	17	74,059
February 2, 2020	LIV	San Francisco 49ers	20	Kansas City Chiefs	31	62,417

=== College football ===
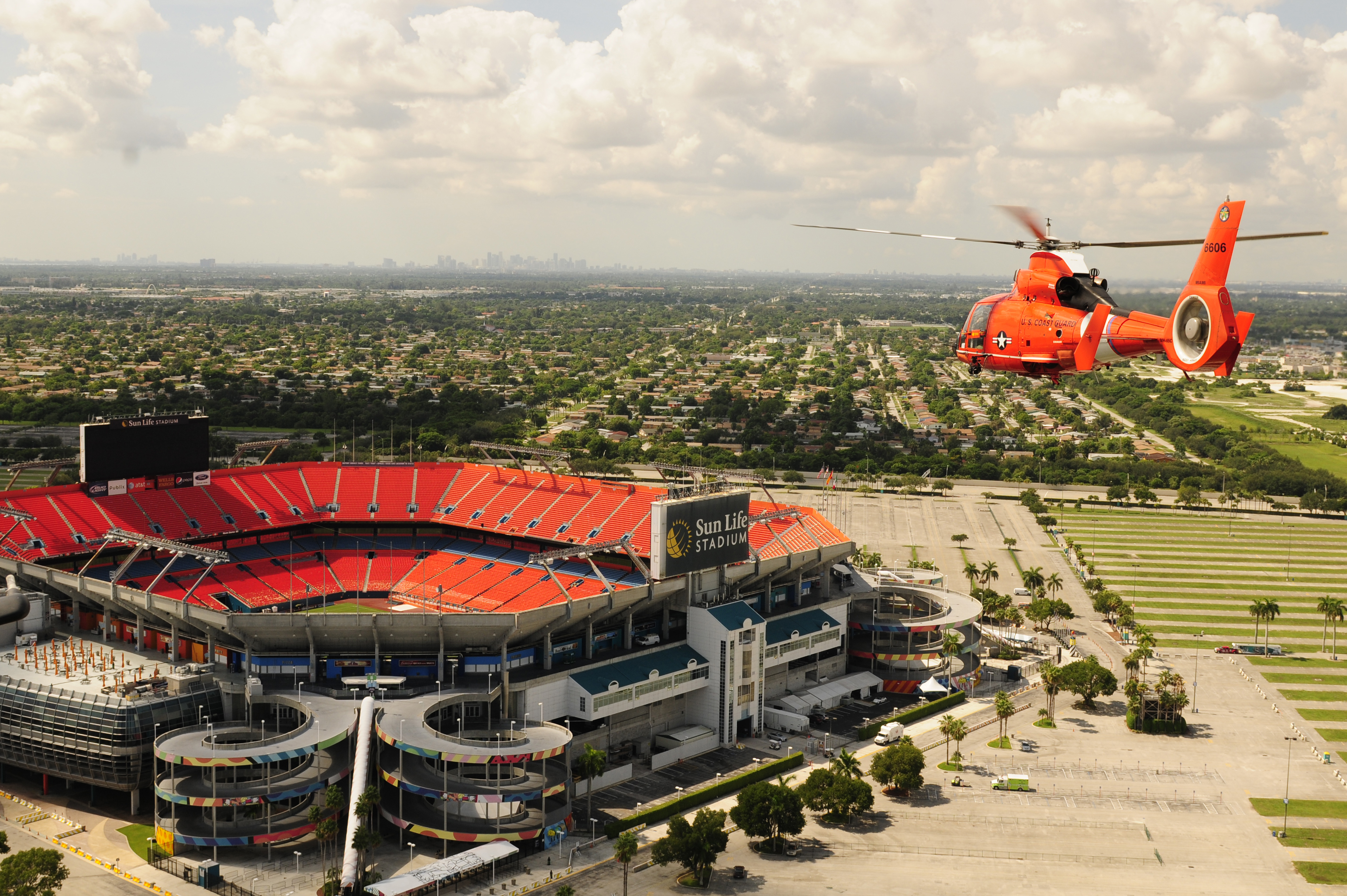
A U.S. Coast Guard MH-65 Dolphin helicopter flying over the stadium in August 2011

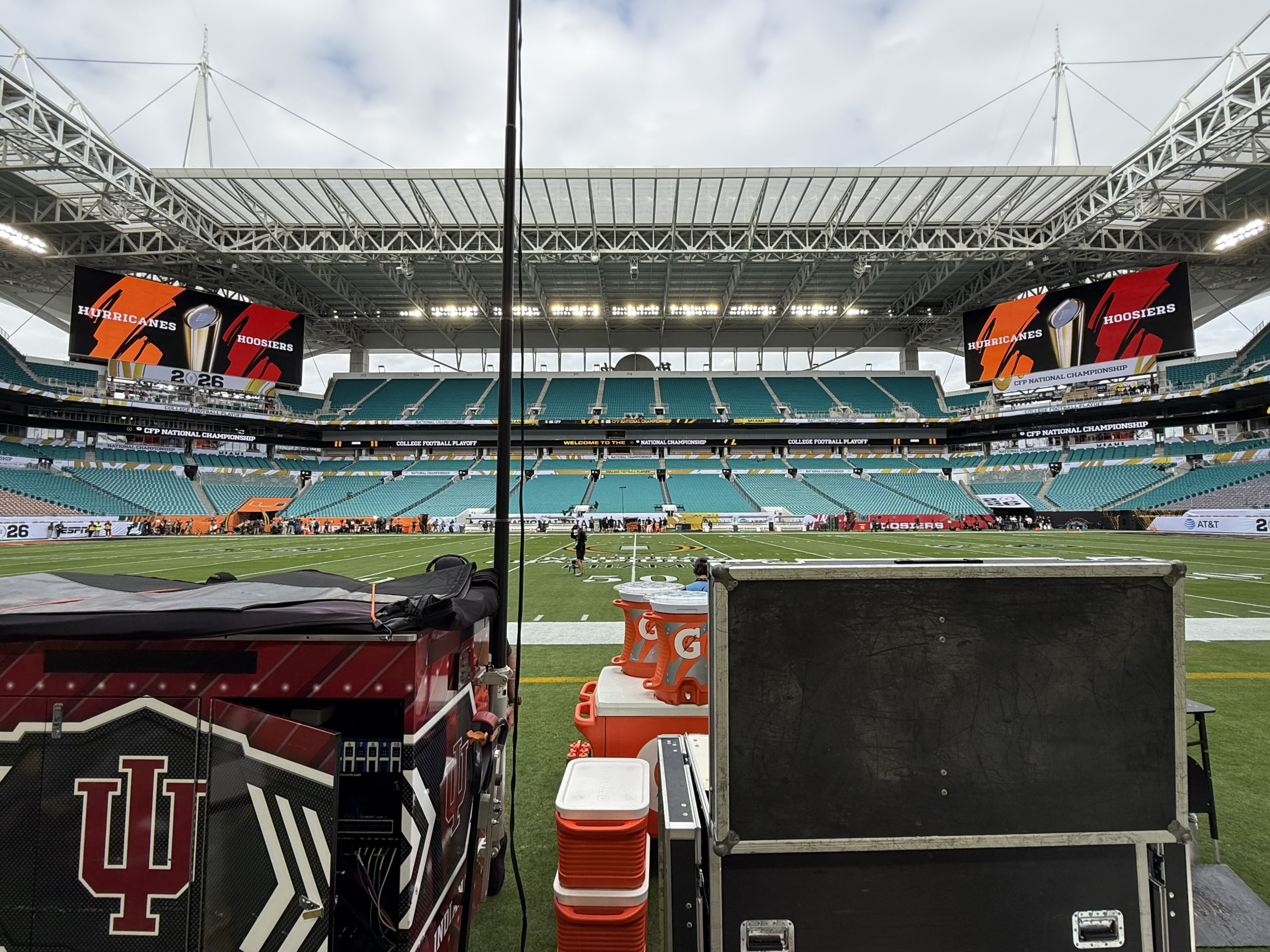
The stadium before the 2026 CFP National Championship

Since 2008, the stadium has served as the home field for the Miami Hurricanes, one of college football's most storied football programs. It also served briefly as the home field for the Florida Atlantic Owls from 2001 to 2002.

The stadium has hosted both the 2009 BCS National Championship Game and the 2013 BCS National Championship Game. The 2013 game between Alabama and Notre Dame set a new attendance record for the facility, with 80,120 on hand to witness Alabama's third BCS Championship in four seasons.

Between 1990 and 2000, the stadium hosted a bowl game variously known as the Blockbuster Bowl, CarQuest Bowl and MicronPC Bowl. After 2000, that bowl was moved to Orlando, where it eventually became known as the Pop-Tarts Bowl.

The stadium has been the site of the Orange Bowl game since 1996, except for the January 1999 contest between Florida and Syracuse, which had to be moved due to a conflict with a Dolphins playoff game.

Until 2008, the stadium was host (in even numbered years) to the annual Shula Bowl, a game played between the Florida Atlantic University Owls and the Florida International University Panthers, when the game was hosted by FAU as the home team (FIU hosts the game at its own stadium, Riccardo Silva Stadium, every other year). In 2010, the game was moved to Fort Lauderdale's Lockhart Stadium, and in 2011 the Owls opened FAU Stadium on its Boca Raton campus, and started hosting the Shula Bowl there biennially in 2012.

The stadium hosted the 2021 College Football Playoff National Championship game, the 2022 College Football Playoff National Championship semi-final game (as the Orange Bowl), and the 2026 College Football Playoff National Championship on January 19, 2026, and will host the 2030 College Football Playoff National Championship on January 21, 2030.

BCS and CFP National Championship Games Hosted (Non-Orange Bowl)
Year/Format	Date	Champion		Runner-up	
2009 BCS	January 8	No. 2 Florida (12–1)	24	No. 1 Oklahoma (12–1)	14
2013 BCS	January 7	No. 2 Alabama (12–1)	42	No. 1 Notre Dame (12–0)	14
2021 CFP	January 11	No. 1 Alabama (12–0)	52	No. 3 Ohio State (7–0)	24
2026 CFP	January 19	No. 1 Indiana (15–0)	27	No. 10 Miami (FL) (13–2)	21

=== WrestleMania XXVIII ===
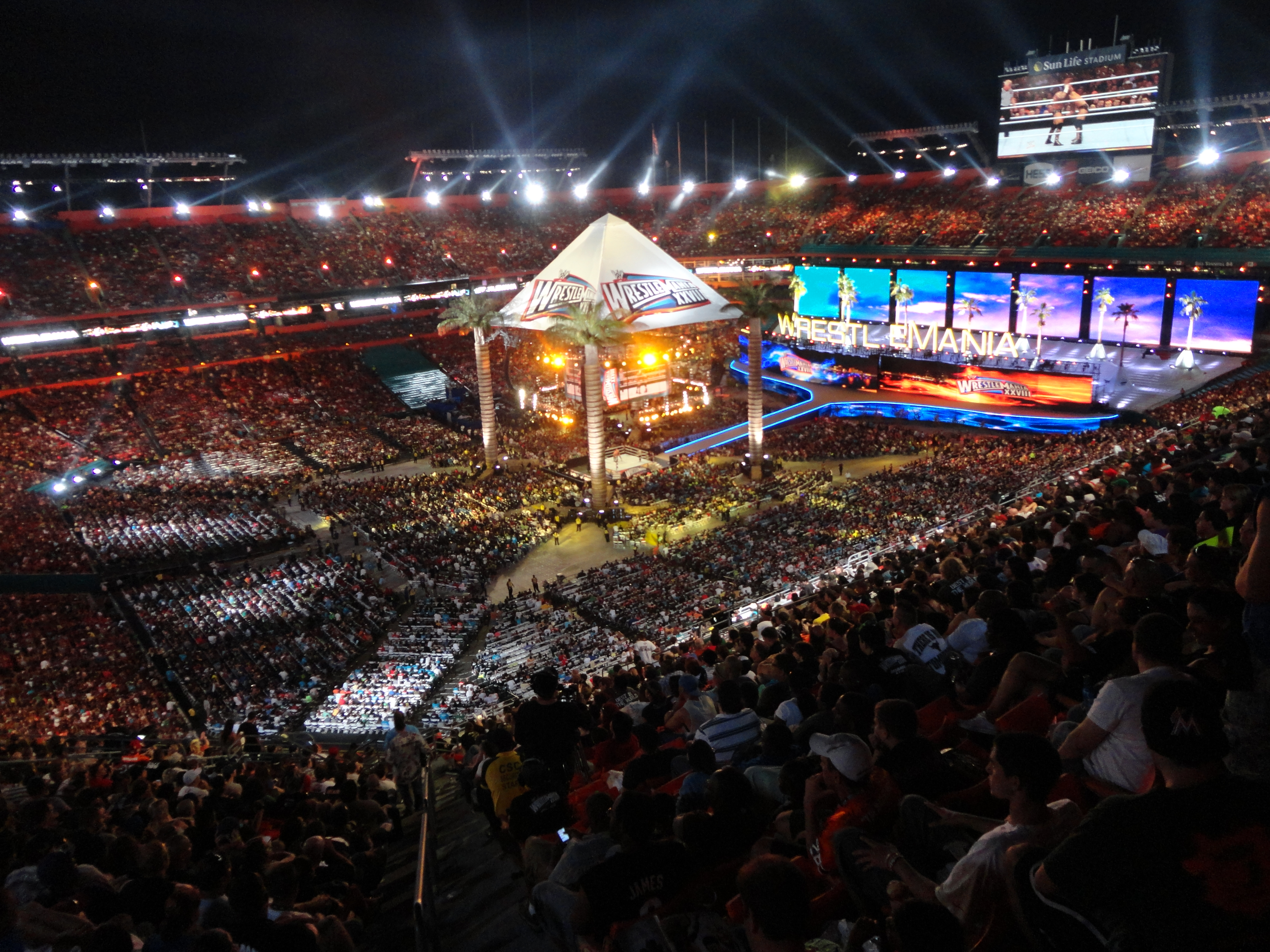
A record at the time, 78,363 fans packed Sun Life Stadium for WrestleMania XXVIII in April 2012

On April 1, 2012, the stadium hosted WrestleMania XXVIII, WWE's flagship professional wrestling event. This was the second edition of WrestleMania to be held in Florida, and the third to be held entirely outdoors. The event was headlined by the "Once in a Lifetime" match where The Rock defeated John Cena. The other most prominent match on the card was the "End of an Era" Hell in a Cell match, in which The Undertaker defeated Triple H to extend his WrestleMania winning streak to 20–0. Shawn Michaels served as special guest referee for the match. With an attendance of 78,363, the event grossed $67 million, and generated $103 million in estimated revenue for Miami. With 1.217 million buys, it is the most purchased WWE PPV.

=== Baseball ===
Two National League Division Series have been played at Hard Rock Stadium:

- 1997 against the San Francisco Giants: Marlins win 3 games to 0
- 2003 against the San Francisco Giants: Marlins win 3 games to 1

Two National League Championship Series have been played at Hard Rock Stadium:

- 1997 against the Atlanta Braves: Marlins win 4 games to 2
- 2003 against the Chicago Cubs: Marlins win 4 games to 3

Two World Series have been played at Hard Rock Stadium:

- 1997 against the Cleveland Indians: Marlins win 4 games to 3
- 2003 against the New York Yankees: Marlins win 4 games to 2

All those series have been played when the stadium went by the name Pro Player Stadium.

When the Marlins began play in 1993, the stadium's baseball capacity was initially reduced to 47,662, with most of the upper level covered with a tarp. In addition to Huizenga's desire to create a more intimate atmosphere for baseball, most of the seats in the upper level would have been too far from the field to be of any use during the regular season. The stadium's baseball capacity was further reduced over the years, and finally settled at 38,560 seats. However, the Marlins would usually open the entire upper level for the postseason. In the 1997 World Series, the Marlins played before crowds of over 67,000 fans, some of the highest postseason attendance figures in MLB history, only exceeded by Cleveland Stadium during the 1948 and 1954 World Series, old Yankee Stadium prior to its mid-1970s renovation, and the Los Angeles Memorial Coliseum, the temporary home of the Los Angeles Dodgers, in the 1959 World Series.

Although it was designed from the ground up to accommodate baseball, it was never a true multipurpose stadium. Rather, it was built as a football stadium that could convert into a baseball stadium. Most of the seats in the baseball configuration were pointed toward center field – where the 50-yard line would have been in the football configuration. As a result, even with the reduced capacity, the sight lines for baseball left much to be desired. This was particularly evident during the Marlins' World Series appearances in 1997 and 2003. Some portions of left and center field were not part of the football playing field, and fans sitting in the left field upper-deck seats were unable to see these areas except on the replay boards. Even with the reduced capacity, during years the Marlins were not contending, they often drew crowds of 5,000 or fewer—a total that looked even smaller due to the spacious environment.

The stadium was notorious for its poor playing conditions. The lights were not located in optimal positions for baseball visibility. During August and September, when the Dolphins (and later the Hurricanes) shared the stadium, the field conditions were among the worst in the majors, according to both Marlins players and visiting players. Indeed, several Marlins players said that at times, they "couldn't wait to go on the road." Visiting teams hated coming to the stadium as well. For instance, when the Atlanta Braves came to the stadium for the last time in 2011, Dan Uggla, who played for the Marlins from 2006 to 2010, said that he was probably the only Braves player that would miss it. The stadium's problems as a baseball venue became even more stark as time wore on, as the Marlins' tenure in the stadium coincided with a wave of new, baseball-only parks. When the Marlins began play in 1993, the stadium was one of 14 that hosted both an MLB team and a professional football team. By the time the Marlins left the stadium, however, it was one of only three in the majors (and the only National League stadium) that played host to both a baseball team and an NFL or CFL team, the other two being the Oakland Coliseum and Toronto's Rogers Centre.

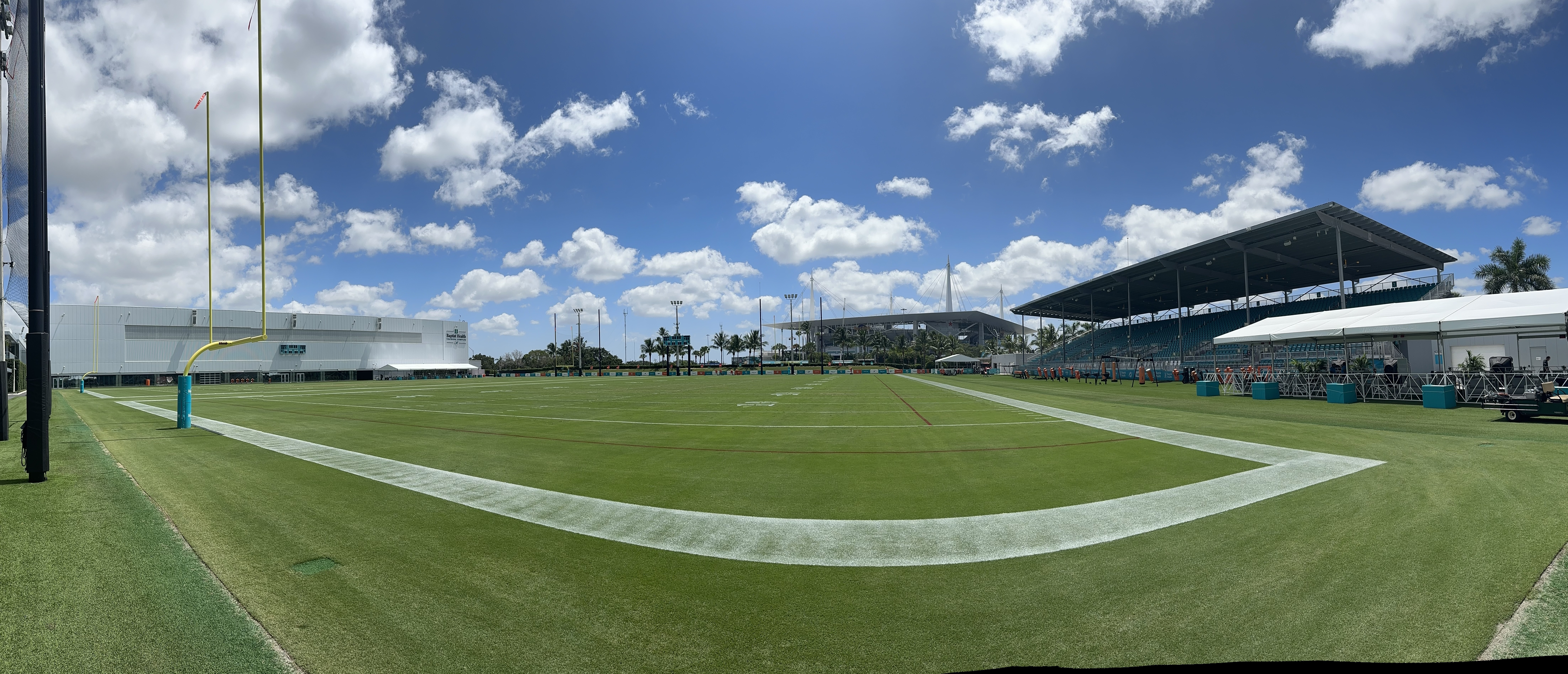
Baptist Health Training Complex in July 2025 ahead of Miami Dolphins training camp

For most of the Marlins' tenure at the stadium, it was the hottest stadium in the major leagues. The Marlins played nearly all of their home games from late May through mid-September at night due to South Florida's often oppressive heat and humidity. They also got waivers from MLB and ESPN to play on Sunday nights.

The stadium was the venue where Mark McGwire hit his NL-record 57th home run to best Hack Wilson's 68-year-old record of 56 in 1998. Ken Griffey Jr. hit his 600th career home run off Mark Hendrickson of the Marlins on June 9, 2008; and where Roy Halladay of the Philadelphia Phillies pitched the 20th perfect game in Major League Baseball history on May 29, 2010, against the Marlins.

=== Concerts ===
Date	Performer(s)	Opening act(s)	Tour/Event	Attendance	Revenue	Notes
July 3, 1988	Rod Stewart; Hall & Oates; Chicago	John Day and Full Circle	Happy Birthday America '88		—	
July 30, 1989	The Who	—	The Who Tour 1989	54,339 / 54,339	$1,222,628	
April 14, 1990	Paul McCartney	—	The Paul McCartney World Tour	95,410 / 95,410	$2,862,300	
April 15, 1990	Paul McCartney	—	The Paul McCartney World Tour	95,410 / 95,410	$2,862,300	
August 12, 1990	New Kids on the Block		The Magic Summer Tour		—	
December 31, 1991	Guns N' Roses	—	Use Your Illusion Tour	—	—	
May 16, 1992	Genesis	—	We Can't Dance Tour	—	—	
July 4, 1992	Chicago	—	—	—	—	
September 26, 1992	Crosby, Stills & Nash	—	—	—	—	
October 3, 1992	U2	Big Audio Dynamite II; Public Enemy	Zoo TV Tour	45,244 / 46,000	$1,289,454	
March 30, 1994	Pink Floyd		The Division Bell Tour	54,738 / 54,738	$1,975,665	
November 25, 1994	The Rolling Stones	Bryan Adams; Blind Melon; Lenny Kravitz	Voodoo Lounge Tour	55,935 / 55,935	$2,574,810	Special Guest Michael Hutchence.
April 13, 1995	Billy Joel; Elton John	—	Face to Face 1995	103,694 / 103,694	$4,385,725	
April 14, 1995	Billy Joel; Elton John	—	Face to Face 1995	103,694 / 103,694	$4,385,725	
March 8, 1997	The Three Tenors	—	The Three Tenors World Tour	—	—	
November 14, 1997	U2	Smash Mouth	PopMart Tour	42,778 / 44,500	$2,158,988	
July 10, 2007	The Police	Maroon 5 Fiction Plane	The Police Reunion Tour	46,105 / 46,105	$5,094,870	
November 26, 2008	Madonna	Paul Oakenfold	Sticky & Sweet Tour	47,998 / 47,998	$6,137,030	Timbaland and Pharrell Williams were the special guests onstage.
April 3, 2010	Paul McCartney	—	Up and Coming Tour	35,784 / 35,784	$4,325,859	
June 29, 2011	U2	Florence and the Machine	U2 360° Tour	72,569 / 72,569	$6,799,670	The concert was originally scheduled to take place on July 9, 2010, but then it was postponed due to Bono's back surgery.
November 23, 2011	The Black Eyed Peas	Sean Kingston; Jason Derulo; T-Pain; CeeLo Green; Queen Latifah	The Beginning	—	—	
August 16, 2013	Justin Timberlake; Jay-Z	DJ Cassidy	Legends of the Summer	46,366 / 46,366	$5,350,175	
June 25, 2014	Beyoncé; Jay-Z	—	On the Run Tour	49,980 / 49,980	$5,450,026	
October 5, 2014	One Direction	5 Seconds of Summer	Where We Are Tour	53,914 / 53,914	$4,303,749	
June 11, 2017	U2	OneRepublic	The Joshua Tree Tour 2017	48,494 / 48,494	$5,923,665	
July 7, 2017	Metallica	Avenged Sevenfold; Volbeat	WorldWired Tour	42,168 / 45,433	$3,163,523	
August 28, 2017	Coldplay	AlunaGeorge; Izzy Bizu	A Head Full of Dreams Tour	47,866 / 47,866	$6,446,966	
April 21, 2018	Eagles	Jimmy Buffett	North American Tour 2018			
August 18, 2018	Taylor Swift	Camila Cabello; Charli XCX	Reputation Stadium Tour	47,818 / 47,818	$7,072,164	
August 30, 2018	Beyoncé, Jay-Z	Chloe X Halle; DJ Khaled	On the Run II Tour	44,310 / 44,310	$6,295,535	
August 30, 2019	The Rolling Stones	—N/a	No Filter Tour	40,768 / 40,768	$9,762,771	This concert was originally scheduled to take place on April 20, 2019, but was postponed due to Mick Jagger recovering from a heart procedure. Ultimately, due to the weather forecast of the impending Hurricane Dorian, the scheduled August 31 concert was moved up one day. The last tour concert ever to feature late drummer Charlie Watts.
August 1, 2021	Green Day; Fall Out Boy; Weezer	The Interrupters	Hella Mega Tour	24,102 / 24,102	$2,093,855	Rescheduled from August 5, 2020
August 14, 2021	Aventura		Inmortal Stadium Tour	40,538 / 40,538	$6,017,014	The first Latin act to sell out in this stadium.
June 18, 2022	Def Leppard; Mötley Crüe	Joan Jett & the Blackhearts; Poison	The Stadium Tour	40,250 / 43,960	$3,348,674	
August 6, 2022	The Weeknd	Kaytranada; Mike Dean	After Hours til Dawn Stadium Tour	45,142 / 45,142	$6,470,071	
August 12, 2022	Bad Bunny	Alesso	World's Hottest Tour	97,655 / 97,655	$21,900,878	
August 13, 2022	Bad Bunny	Alesso	World's Hottest Tour	97,655 / 97,655	$21,900,878	
August 30, 2022	Red Hot Chili Peppers	The Strokes; Thundercat	2022 Global Stadium Tour	42,572 / 42,572	$5,536,614	
September 17, 2022	Lady Gaga	—	The Chromatica Ball	44,298 / 44,298	$5,878,508	
August 18, 2023	Beyoncé	—	Renaissance World Tour	47,487 / 47,487	$14,362,704	
August 25, 2023	Karol G	Agudelo; Bad Gyal	Mañana Será Bonito Tour	89,814 / 89,814	$18,578,460	
August 26, 2023	Karol G	Agudelo; Bad Gyal	Mañana Será Bonito Tour	89,814 / 89,814	$18,578,460	
July 6, 2024	Feid		Ferxxocalipsis Tour			
October 18, 2024	Taylor Swift	Gracie Abrams	The Eras Tour	183,000 / 183,000	TBA	First act to perform three shows on a single tour.
October 19, 2024	Taylor Swift	Gracie Abrams	The Eras Tour	183,000 / 183,000	TBA	First act to perform three shows on a single tour.
October 20, 2024	Taylor Swift	Gracie Abrams	The Eras Tour	183,000 / 183,000	TBA	First act to perform three shows on a single tour.
June 6, 2025	Shakira	TBA	Las Mujeres Ya No Lloran World Tour	TBA	TBA	
June 7, 2025	Shakira	TBA	Las Mujeres Ya No Lloran World Tour	TBA	TBA	
June 8, 2025	Post Malone Jelly Roll		Big Ass Stadium Tour			
July 11, 2025	Morgan Wallen	Miranda Lambert; Gavin Adcock	I'm The Problem Tour	TBA	TBA	
July 12, 2025	Morgan Wallen	Brooks & Dunn; Gavin Adcock	I'm The Problem Tour	TBA	TBA	
July 26, 2025	Coldplay	Ayra Starr; Elyanna	Music of the Spheres World Tour	TBA	TBA	First group to schedule two shows on a single tour.
July 27, 2025	Coldplay	Ayra Starr; Elyanna	Music of the Spheres World Tour	TBA	TBA	First group to schedule two shows on a single tour.
August 15, 2025	The Weeknd	Playboi Carti; Mike Dean	After Hours til Dawn Tour	TBA	TBA	
August 16, 2025	The Weeknd	Playboi Carti; Mike Dean	After Hours til Dawn Tour	TBA	TBA	
September 19, 2026	Bruno Mars	DJ Pee .Wee; Raye	The Romantic Tour	TBA	TBA	
September 20, 2026	Bruno Mars	DJ Pee .Wee; Raye	The Romantic Tour	TBA	TBA	
October 2, 2026	Karol G		Viajando Por El Mundo Tropitour			
October 3, 2026	Karol G		Viajando Por El Mundo Tropitour			
December 3, 2026	Usher; Chris Brown		The R&B Tour			

=== Soccer ===
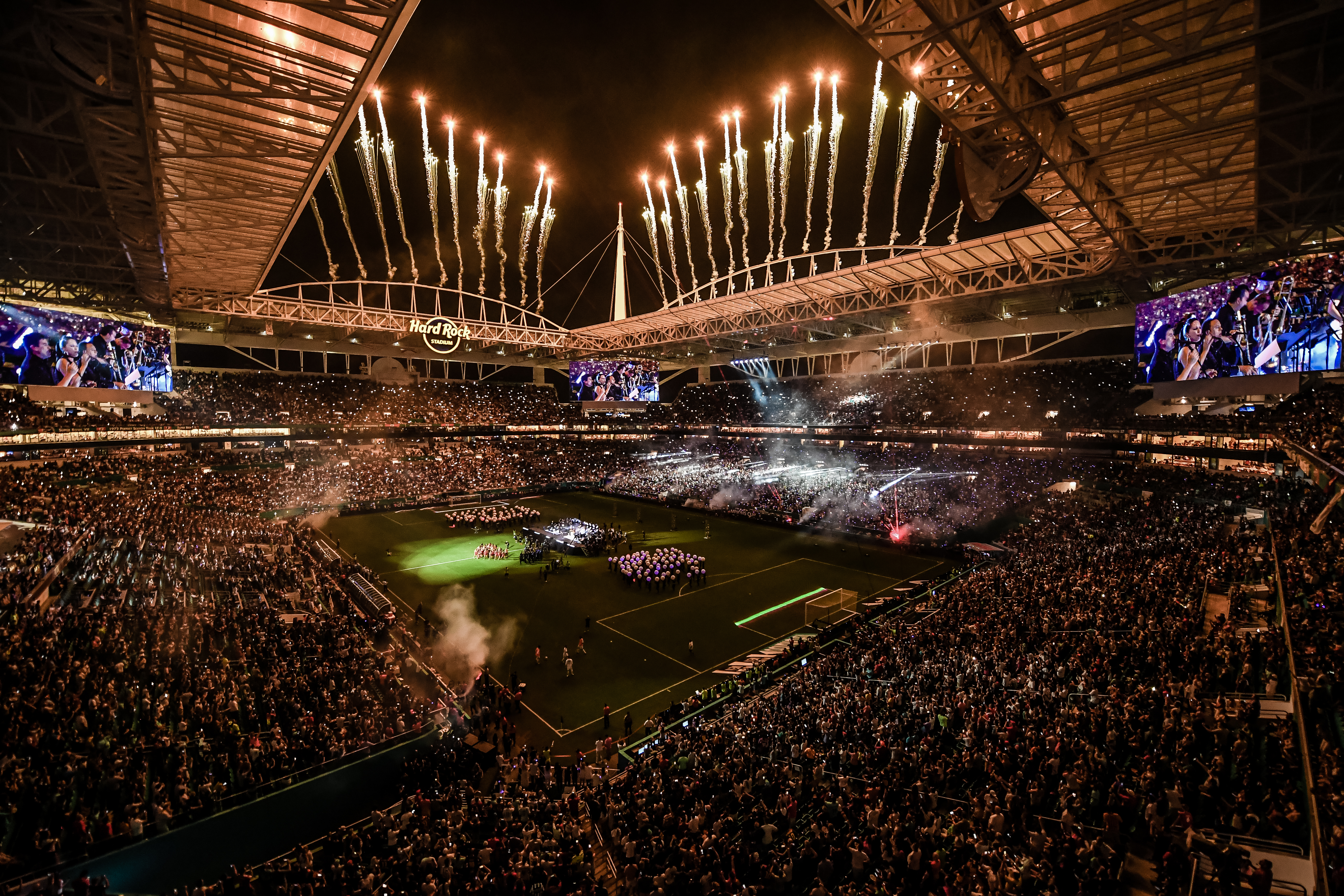
El Clásico at Hard Rock Stadium in July 2017

A number of soccer matches have been held at the stadium, including a number of international friendlies featuring Central or South American sides. This is due to South Florida being home to one of the largest populations of Central and South Americans in the United States.

The stadium hosted a match between FC Barcelona and C.D. Guadalajara on August 3, 2011, as part of the 2011 World Football Challenge. Guadalajara won the match 4–1 in front of 70,080 attendees.

Colombia beat Mexico 2–0 in a friendly international in front of 51,615 spectators at the stadium on February 29, 2012. A year later, they beat Guatemala 4–1.

Milan and Chelsea faced each other at the stadium on July 28, 2012. Milan won the match 1–0 in front of 57,748 fans.

Brazil beat Honduras 5–0 in a friendly match in front of 71,124 spectators on November 16, 2013. The attendance was the highest for a soccer match at the stadium.

England played Ecuador and Honduras at the New Miami Stadium on June 4 and 7, 2014, respectively.

South Korea played against Ghana on June 9, 2014.

On September 5, 2014, two months after a heavy defeat to Germany in the World Cup, Brazil beat Colombia 1–0 in front of an announced attendance of 73,429 fans, a new attendance record for a soccer match at the stadium.

The 2014 International Champions Cup preseason final was held at New Miami Stadium on August 4, 2014, with Manchester United defeating rival Liverpool 3–1 to claim the tournament's second title.

Two 2017 International Champions Cup preseason matches were played at the stadium, one of them being the El Clásico between Barcelona and Real Madrid. Barcelona won 3–2 in the second El Clásico to take place outside of Spain. 66,014 people, above current capacity, attended the match.

On March 23, 2018, the international friendly Peru–Croatia was played at the stadium, which Peru won 2–0.

On October 6, 2025, UEFA approved for a regular season La Liga match to be played outside of Spain, with Villarreal CF and FC Barcelona set to play at the stadium on December 20. After protests occurred during La Liga matches following the decision, where players did not move for the first 15 seconds of the game, the match was moved out of Miami on October 21.

==== Matches ====
Date	Team (Visitor)	Goals	Team (Home)	Goals	Spectators
February 18, 1994	Colombia	0	Sweden	0	15,676
February 18, 1994	Bolivia	1	United States	1	15,676
February 20, 1994	Bolivia	0	Colombia	2	20,171
February 20, 1994	Sweden	3	United States	1	20,171
February 21, 1998	Netherlands	2	United States	0	15,000
February 24, 1998	Mexico	2	Netherlands	3	7,077
August 3, 2011	(Spain) Barcelona	1	(Mexico) Guadalajara	4	70,080
October 8, 2011	Honduras	0	United States	1	21,900
February 29, 2012	Colombia	2	Mexico	0	51,615
July 28, 2012	(Italy) Milan	1	(England) Chelsea	0	57,748
February 6, 2013	Guatemala	1	Colombia	4	25,000
June 8, 2013	Haiti	1	Spain	2	36,535
July 12, 2013	Haiti	2	Trinidad and Tobago	0	28,713
July 12, 2013	El Salvador	0	Honduras	1	28,713
August 6, 2013	(Italy) Juventus	1	(Italy) Inter Milan	1	38,513
August 6, 2013	(England) Everton	0	(Spain) Valencia	1	38,513
August 7, 2013	(Italy) Milan	2	(United States) LA Galaxy	0	67,273
August 7, 2013	(England) Chelsea	1	(Spain) Real Madrid	3	67,273
November 16, 2013	Brazil	5	Honduras	0	71,124
June 4, 2014	England	2	Ecuador	2	21,534
June 7, 2014	Honduras	0	England	0	45,379
June 9, 2014	Ghana	4	South Korea	0	7,000
August 4, 2014	(England) Manchester United	3	(England) Liverpool	1	51,014
September 5, 2014	Brazil	1	Colombia	0	73,429
July 26, 2017	(France) Paris Saint-Germain	2	(Italy) Juventus	3	44,444
July 29, 2017	(Spain) Barcelona	3	(Spain) Real Madrid	2	66,014
March 23, 2018	Croatia	0	Peru	2	60,000
July 28, 2018	(Germany) Bayern Munich	2	(England) Manchester City	3	29,195
July 31, 2018	(England) Manchester United	2	(Spain) Real Madrid	1	64,141
September 7, 2018	Colombia	2	Venezuela	1	34,048
October 12, 2018	Chile	0	Peru	3	34,016
August 7, 2019	(Spain) Barcelona	2	(Italy) Napoli	1	57,062
September 6, 2019	Colombia	2	Brazil	2	65,232
November 15, 2019	Peru	0	Colombia	1	36,063
September 23, 2022	Argentina	3	Honduras	0	64,420
October 10, 2025	Argentina	1	Venezuela	0	20,000

==== 2024 Copa América ====
The stadium hosted several matches during the 2024 Copa América, including the final match of the tournament.

Date	Team	Goals	Team	Goals	Spectators
June 23, 2024	Uruguay	3	Panama	1	33,425
June 29, 2024	Peru	0	Argentina	2	64,972
July 14, 2024	Argentina	1	Colombia	0	65,300

==== 2025 FIFA Club World Cup ====
The stadium hosted several matches during the 2025 FIFA Club World Cup.

Date	Time (UTC−4)	Team #1	Res.	Team #2	Round	Attendance
June 14, 2025	20:00	(Egypt) Al Ahly	0–0	(United States) Inter Miami CF	Group A	60,927
June 16, 2025	18:00	(Argentina) Boca Juniors	2–2	(Portugal) Benfica	Group C	55,574
June 18, 2025	15:00	(Spain) Real Madrid	1–1	(Saudi Arabia) Al Hilal	Group H	62,415
June 20, 2025	21:00	(Germany) Bayern Munich	2–1	(Argentina) Boca Juniors	Group C	63,587
June 23, 2025	21:00	(United States) Inter Miami CF	2–2	(Brazil) Palmeiras	Group A	60,914
June 25, 2025	15:00	(South Africa) Mamelodi Sundowns	0–0	(Brazil) Fluminense	Group F	14,312
June 29, 2025	16:00	(Brazil) Flamengo	2–4	(Germany) Bayern Munich	Round of 16	60,914
July 1, 2025	15:00	(Spain) Real Madrid	1–0	(Italy) Juventus	Round of 16	62,149

==== 2026 FIFA World Cup ====
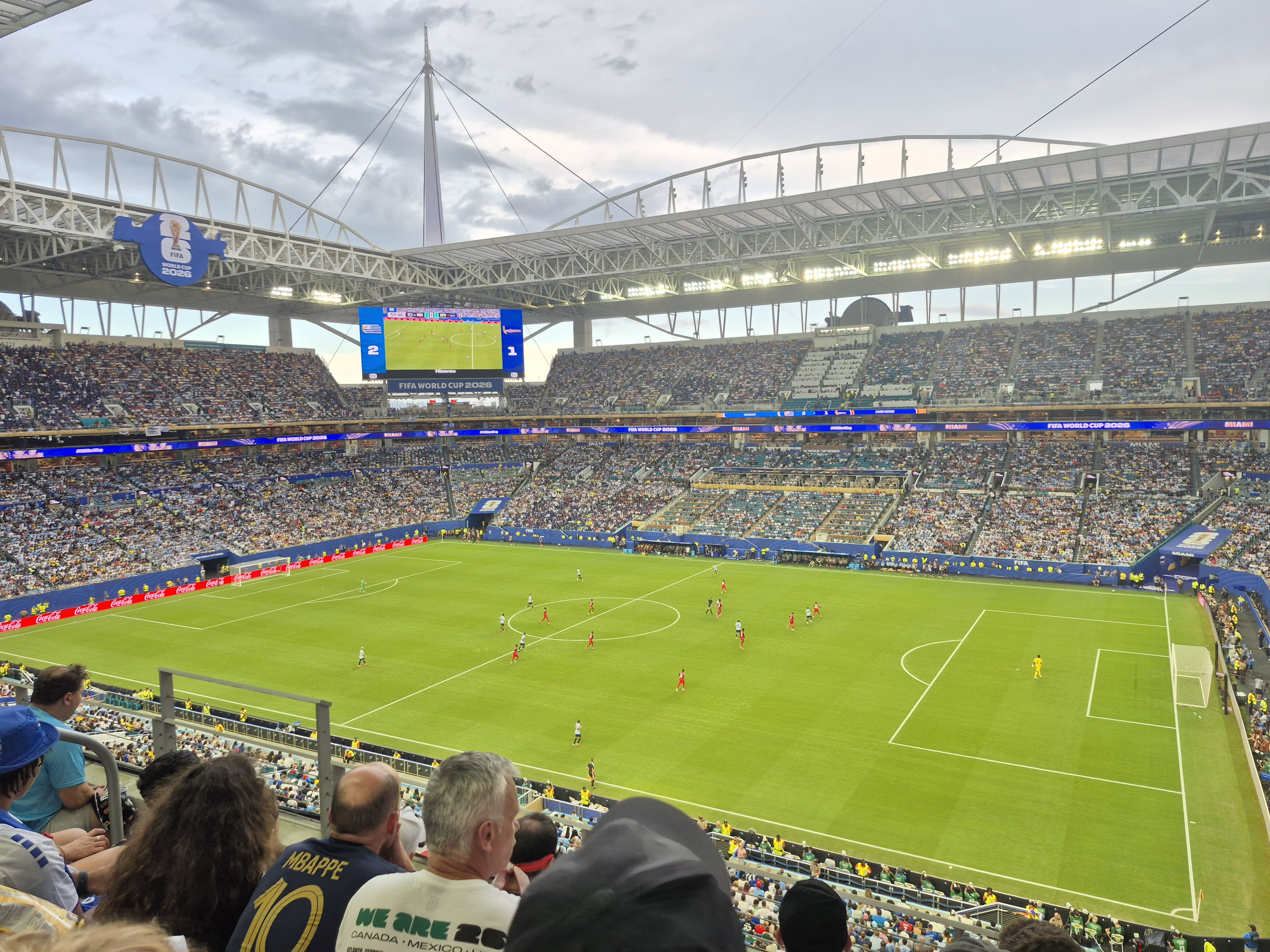
Hard Rock Stadium during the match between Uruguay and Cape Verde.

The stadium hosted several matches during the 2026 FIFA World Cup. During the event, the stadium was referred to as "Miami Stadium" in accordance with FIFA's policy on corporate-sponsored names. The stadium hosted seven matches: four group stage matches, one Round of 32 match, one quarterfinal match, and the third place match.

Date	Time (UTC−4)	Team #1	Res.	Team #2	Round	Attendance
June 15, 2026	18:00	Saudi Arabia	1–1	Uruguay	Group H	62,764
June 21, 2026	18:00	Uruguay	2–2	Cape Verde	Group H	64,003
June 24, 2026	18:00	Scotland	0–3	Brazil	Group C	64,478
June 27, 2026	19:30	Colombia	0–0	Portugal	Group K	64,478
July 3, 2026	18:00	Argentina	3–2 (a.e.t.)	Cape Verde	Round of 32	64,478
July 11, 2026	17:00	Norway	1–2 (a.e.t.)	England	Quarterfinal	64,478
July 18, 2026	17:00	France	4–6	England	3rd place playoff	64,478

=== Monster Jam ===
The monster truck touring series Monster Jam used to take place at the stadium every year. The last show performed there was in 2015, and the shows moved to Marlins Park (now LoanDepot Park) in 2018.

Year	Date	Racing Winner	Freestyle Winner
2000	January 29	Gunslinger	Gunslinger
2001	January 27	BearFoot	Bulldozer
2002	January 26	Gunslinger	El Toro Loco
2003	January 25	El Toro Loco	Grave Digger
2004	January 24	MADUSA	Grave Digger
2005	February 5	Grave Digger	El Toro Loco/Grave Digger (tie)
2006	February 4	Gunslinger	Blue Thunder
2007	February 17	El Toro Loco	Grave Digger
2008	February 2	Blue Thunder	Grave Digger
2009	January 31	Stone Crusher	Grave Digger
2010	February 20	Gunslinger	Maximum Destruction
2011	February 12	Mohawk Warrior	Grave Digger
2012	February 11	Bounty Hunter	Advance Auto Parts Grinder
2013	February 9	Bounty Hunter	Grave Digger
2014	February 8	Grave Digger The Legend	El Toro Loco
2015	January 3	Grave Digger The Legend	
2016	No Show (Stadium Renovations)		
2017	No Show (Unknown Reasoning)		
2018	No Show (Moved to Marlins Park)		

=== Boxing ===
On February 27, 2021, four-division boxing world champion Canelo Álvarez beat Avni Yildirim at Hard Rock Stadium to defend his WBA (Super), WBC and The Ring super-middleweight titles.

On June 6, 2021, the stadium hosted the boxing event Bragging Rights between Floyd Mayweather Jr. and YouTube personality Logan Paul.

On June 12, 2021, the stadium hosted the Social Gloves boxing event YouTubers vs. TikTokers, with Austin McBroom and Bryce Hall headlining the event.

=== Other events ===
Other events held at the stadium have included international soccer games, Hoop-It-Up Basketball, RV and boat shows, the UniverSoul Circus, numerous trade shows, and religious gatherings. The stadium has also hosted Australian rules football exhibition matches (including two Victorian Football League post-season exhibitions). The 1988 exhibition between Collingwood and Geelong was played on the diagonal to compensate for the stadium not being an oval, as was the 1989 Foster's Cup semifinal between Hawthorn and Essendon, with the latter also featuring 15 players per team instead of the usual 18 since the playing surface was smaller than the grounds that it is typically played on.

In 2006, it hosted the High School State Football Championships, sanctioned by the Florida High School Athletic Association (FHSAA).

In 2020, during the COVID-19 pandemic, the stadium began temporarily hosting an outdoor movie theater at the tennis campus and a drive-in theater in the stadium itself. Additionally, the East Lot of the venue has been used as a COVID-19 testing site, drawing hundreds of cars every day at the peak of the pandemic.

On April 18, 2021, Formula 1 announced a 10-year deal with the stadium to host the Miami Grand Prix, utilizing the stadium's large parking lots and service roads to create a course known as the Miami International Autodrome.

Since 2018, the stadium has hosted the large hip-hop music festival Rolling Loud. The festival was held for its fourth consecutive year at the stadium from July 22 to 24, 2022, and featured headliners including Ye, Future, and Kendrick Lamar.

=== In film ===
Three films have been shot at the stadium:

- 1994: Ace Ventura: Pet Detective, which starred Jim Carrey and featured former Dolphins quarterback Dan Marino as himself
- 1999: Any Given Sunday, starring Al Pacino and directed by Oliver Stone
- 2008: Marley and Me, starring Owen Wilson and Jennifer Aniston

== Naming rights ==
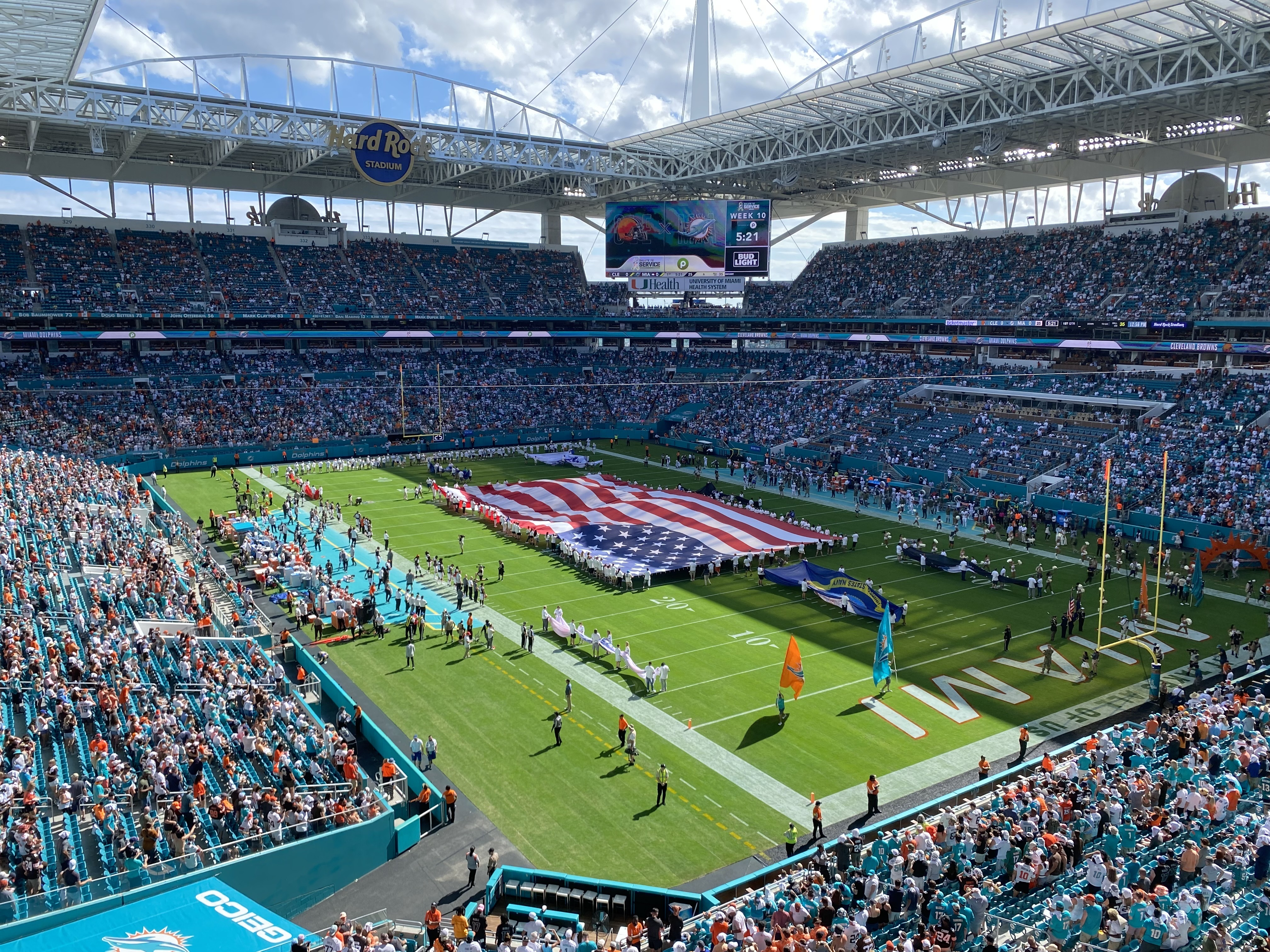
Hard Rock Stadium during the national anthem before the Miami Dolphins host the Cleveland Browns in November 2022

The stadium has gone through many name changes, bringing up a question of the value of corporate naming rights.

During the planning and building phase of the stadium, the stadium was referred to as Dolphin Stadium. Joe Robbie, the original and then-owner of the Miami Dolphins and the new stadium, did not want the stadium named after himself, saying, "I didn't want them to name it after me. But they insisted, and I guess I'm only human." The stadium opened on August 16, 1987, as Joe Robbie Stadium.

In the early 1990s, Wayne Huizenga gained control of the stadium. Huizenga first sold the naming rights to Pro Player, the sports apparel division of Fruit of the Loom, and the stadium became Pro Player Park on August 26, 1996. After the Dolphins opened the 1996 season there, the stadium was renamed Pro Player Stadium before the team returned home in week 3. The Marlins' 1996 season was played when the stadium was known under three different names, having started the year under the Joe Robbie name.

Fruit of the Loom filed for Chapter 11 bankruptcy protection in 1999, and the Pro Player brand was ultimately liquidated in 2001, but the stadium name held for several more years. In January 2005, the stadium was renamed Dolphins Stadium, coinciding with a renovation of the stadium. In April 2006, it was renamed Dolphin Stadium in an update of graphics and logos.

From February 2008 to January 2009, Stephen M. Ross gradually acquired 95% of the stadium and surrounding land. He then partnered with Jimmy Buffett to change the name once more, this time to Land Shark Stadium after a beer brewed for Buffett's Margaritaville restaurant chain. The renaming was announced on May 8, 2009, but would last less than a year as the deal did not include rights for the upcoming 2010 Pro Bowl and Super Bowl XLIV.

On January 20, 2010, Canadian financial services company Sun Life Financial announced that it had acquired the naming rights. Sun Life Financial announced in 2012, that it will be exiting the U.S. annuity business and focusing on its employee benefits business in the United States. On August 14, 2015, the Dolphins told the Miami Herald that Sun Life's deal would expire in January 2016, and that the team had no plans to renew, wanting to position its renovated stadium as a brand new entity. The team also stated that it would remove Sun Life's signage upon expiration of the deal, regardless of its ability to find a replacement sponsor before then. During renovations, the stadium was known as New Miami Stadium.

On August 17, 2016, the Dolphins announced that the naming rights had been sold to Hard Rock International, and that the stadium would be renamed Hard Rock Stadium.

Name	Duration
Joe Robbie Stadium	August 16, 1987 – August 25, 1996
Pro Player Park	August 26, 1996 – September 9, 1996
Pro Player Stadium	September 10, 1996 – January 9, 2005
Dolphins Stadium	January 10, 2005 – April 7, 2006
Dolphin Stadium	April 8, 2006 – May 7, 2009
Land Shark Stadium	May 8, 2009 – January 5, 2010
Dolphin Stadium	January 6, 2010 – January 19, 2010
Sun Life Stadium	January 20, 2010 – January 31, 2016
New Miami Stadium	February 1, 2016 – August 16, 2016
Hard Rock Stadium	August 17, 2016 – present

== South Florida Sod Farm ==
Since 2019, Hard Rock Stadium and the Baptist Health Training Complex have sourced the Tifway 419 Bermuda grass playing surface from the South Florida Sod Farm in Loxahatchee Groves, Florida. The property owned by Stephen M. Ross and the Miami Dolphins is the only sod farm owned by a professional sports franchise in the United States. The South Florida Sod Farm allows the organization to regularly replace the playing surface, ensuring the integrity of the field for Dolphins games and other events. The farm spans 96 acres and is capable of growing 20 full-size fields simultaneously.

== See also ==
- List of NCAA Division I FBS football stadiums
- List of American football stadiums by capacity
- Lists of stadiums

Events and tenants
Preceded by Orange Bowl	Home of the Miami Dolphins; 1987 – present	Succeeded by Current
Preceded by Orange Bowl	Home of the Miami Hurricanes; 2008 – present	Succeeded by Current
Preceded by Orange Bowl; Orange Bowl	Host of the Orange Bowl; 1996 – 1998; 2000 – present	Succeeded by Orange Bowl; Current
Preceded by first ballpark	Home of the Florida Marlins; 1993–2011	Succeeded by LoanDepot Park
Preceded by first stadium	Host of the Champs Sports Bowl; 1990–2000	Succeeded by Citrus Bowl
Preceded by Jack Murphy Stadium; Georgia Dome; Qualcomm Stadium; Ford Field; Raymond James Stadium; Mercedes-Benz Stadium	Host of the Super Bowl; XXIII 1989; XXIX 1995; XXXIII 1999; XLI 2007; XLIV 2010; LIV 2020	Succeeded by Louisiana Superdome; Sun Devil Stadium; Georgia Dome; University of Phoenix Stadium; Cowboys Stadium; Raymond James Stadium
Preceded by Louisiana Superdome; Louisiana Superdome; Louisiana Superdome; Mercedes-Benz Superdome	Host of the BCS National Championship Game; 2001; 2005; 2009; 2013	Succeeded by Rose Bowl; Rose Bowl; Rose Bowl; Rose Bowl
Preceded by Rich Stadium	Host of AFC Championship Game; 1993	Succeeded by Rich Stadium
Preceded by Aloha Stadium	Host of the Pro Bowl; 2010	Succeeded by Aloha Stadium
Preceded by Georgia Dome	Host of WrestleMania; 2012 (XXVIII)	Succeeded by MetLife Stadium
Preceded by Crandon Park	Host of the Miami Open; 2019 – present	Succeeded by Current
Preceded by Maracanã Stadium; Rio de Janeiro	Copa América; Final venue 2024	Succeeded by TBD
