= Michael Le =

American dancer (born 2000)

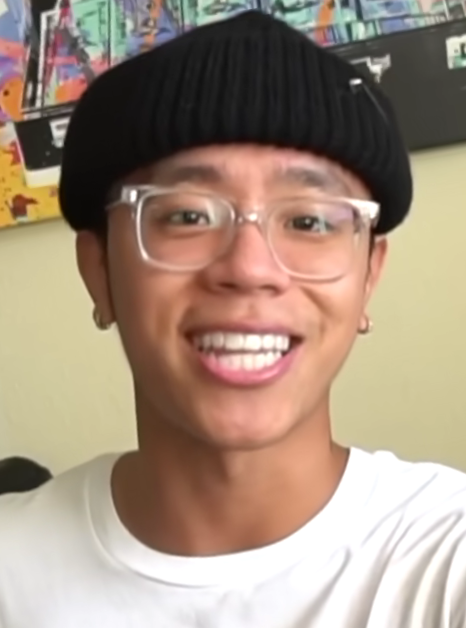
- Le in 2019
- Born: Michael Le; March 19, 2000 (age 26); West Palm Beach, Florida
- Years active: 2014–present

Instagram information
- Page: Michael Le
- Followers: 2.3 million

TikTok information
- Page: Michael Le
- Followers: 49.9 million

YouTube information
- Channel: Justmaiko
- Genre: Dance
- Subscribers: 3.8 million
- Views: 661 million
- Last updated: July 24, 2026

Michael Le (born March 19, 2000), also known as JustMaiko, is an American dancer and social media personality known for his videos of himself dancing in public places. Le is also known for his rolled beanie and his videos have also been credited with boosting the popularity of songs such as "Roxanne" by Arizona Zervas, "Hey Julie!" by Kyle, and "Dream Girl" by Ir-Sais.

== Early life ==
Michael Le was born on March 19, 2000, in West Palm Beach, Florida. He is of Vietnamese descent and has two younger brothers, Jonathan and David, and a sister, Tiffany. His mother, Tina, and Tiffany also have prominent followings on TikTok. Before switching to content creation, Tina had owned a nail salon. Le took his first dance class when he was twelve; he was inspired by Asian-American dance groups such as the Jabbawockeez and Poreotics. His content was inspired by the works of Timothy DeLaGhetto, Ryan Higa, and KevJumba. After his first dance class, he fell in love with dancing and became an instructor in West Palm Beach.

== Career ==
Le was one of the first viral dancers on Instagram, creating his account in 2015 and later making his TikTok account in 2016. His username, "JustMaiko", comes from Asian way of spelling Michael. He started out making dance tutorials in his family's garage, but began gaining additional popularity after uploading more on TikTok. One of Le's first viral videos was a clip of him dancing in a Walmart store; he later became known for his videos of himself dancing in public spaces. Another one of his most viral videos contains him dancing on an escalator. In 2020, he moved to Los Angeles from West Palm Beach with his family and co-founded the Shluv House content house. In December of that year, Le hosted the Snapchat Original series Move It alongside fellow dance creator Dytto.

In June 2021, Le participated in the YouTubers vs. TikTokers boxing event, losing to FaZe Jarvis by knockout. Later that month, he and his family starred in the Brat TV-produced show The Shluv Family, which aired on Facebook Watch. It followed his family doing large-scale challenges together. In 2021, Le made a cameo in the film Spider-Man: No Way Home as a fan trying to get the attention of Spider-Man. He signed with WME Group in 2022. In 2023, Le starred in a five-part TikTok series promoting the video game Ashfall. Later that year, he signed with Creative Artists Agency.

== Awards and nominations ==
Year	Award	Category	Result	Ref.
2020	Streamy Awards	Dance	Nominated	
2022	Streamy Awards	Dance	Nominated	
