= YouTubers vs. TikTokers =

2021 boxing match

- Promotional poster
- Date: June 12, 2021
- Venue: Hard Rock Stadium, Miami Gardens, Florida, U.S.

Tale of the tape
Boxer	Austin McBroom	Bryce Hall
Nickname	The Face of Ace	The Self-Proclaimed Bad Boy of Sway House
Hometown	Los Angeles, California, U.S.	Ellicott City, Maryland, U.S.
Pre-fight record	0–0	0–0
Height	5 ft 11 in (180 cm)	5 ft 10 in (178 cm)
Weight	172 lb (78 kg)	165.4 lb (75.0 kg)
Style	Southpaw	Orthodox

Result
- McBroom defeated Hall via round 3 TKO

YouTubers vs. TikTokers, billed as Battle of the Platforms, was an exhibition boxing event which featured YouTubers and TikTokers. The main event was between American YouTuber Austin McBroom and American TikToker Bryce Hall. The co-main event was between YouTuber AnEsonGib and TikToker Tayler Holder. It was held on June 12, 2021, at Hard Rock Stadium in Miami Gardens, Florida.

In the main event, Austin McBroom defeated Bryce Hall via technical knockout in the third round. In the co-main event, AnEsonGib defeated Tayler Holder via unanimous decision. Overall, Team YouTube defeated Team TikTok 6–1.

The event was promoted as the Battle of the Platforms by Social Gloves. The first two undercard matches were broadcast free of charge on social-media sites, and the pay-per-view was broadcast on LiveXLive.

The event sold 135,000 PPV buys, but was a commercial failure because it cost $20 million to produce but only generated between $6.5 million to $10 million in revenue.

== Background ==
McBroom feuded on Twitter with TikToker Bryce Hall in early March 2021, and a match was booked between them. On March 18, LiveXLive announced a full card of YouTubers vs. TikTokers in which YouTuber Tanner Fox was scheduled to face Nick Austin and YouTuber FaZe Jarvis was scheduled to face TikToker Micheal Le.

=== Press conference ===
The YouTube and TikTok boxers had their first press conference on May 18, which was hosted by YouTubers Keemstar and FouseyTube. Near the end of the press conference, a fight between McBroom and Hall broke out on stage.

=== Weigh-in ===
Before the weigh-in began, there was an altercation backstage between Fousey and Deji, who was noticeably unfit in comparison to the other fighters. The weigh-in, also hosted by Keemstar and Fousey, was held on June 11 in Miami. Austin McBroom weighed 172 lb (78 kg), and Bryce Hall weighed 165.4 lb (75 kg). For the co-main event, AnEsonGib weighed 179 lb (81 kg); Tayler Holder weighed 175 lb (79 kg).

== Fight card ==
	vs.		Method	Round	Time
Austin McBroom (Y)	def.	Bryce Hall (T)	TKO	3/5	1:45
AnEsonGib (Y)	def.	Tayler Holder (T)	UD	5
Vinnie Hacker (T)	def.	Deji Olatunji (Y)	TKO	3/5	1:16
DDG (Y)	def.	Nate Wyatt (T)	UD	5
FaZe Jarvis (Y)	def.	Michael Le (T)	KO	2/5	0:14
Landon McBroom (Y)	def.	Ben Azelart (T)	TKO	2/5	1:30
Ryan Johnston (Y)	def.	Cale Saurage (T)	TKO	5/5	1:07

- Y = Team YouTube
- T = Team TikTok

== Broadcast ==
The event was a pay-per-view broadcast on LiveXLive. Fousey was the ring announcer for the fights, except for the main event. It featured performances by DJ Khaled, Lil Baby, Migos and Trippie Redd. The first two fights on the undercard, Ryan Johnston vs. Cale Saurage and Landon McBroom vs Ben Azelart, were broadcast free of charge on YouTube. A pay-per-view image would show in the screen, blocking the person watching the main card for free.

== Controversies ==
=== Investor return and fighter pay controversy ===
Two months after the event, in August 2021, it was reported that the event had been a financial flop, and that investors and some of the fighters had not been paid their contractual amounts, sparking a series of lawsuits between Austin McBroom and event promoter LivexLive, as well as a lawsuit by Tayler Holder and Nate Wyatt against Austin McBroom for failing to compensate the event participants

As of February 2022, both lawsuits had been settled out of court.

=== Storms–Fox controversy ===
After Tanner Fox and Ryland Storms had their weigh-in one day before the fight, Storms claimed that Fox pulled out of the match because of their weight difference. On the Social Gloves live stream, it was announced that Fox had pulled out. At ringside, ring announcer Fousey interviewed Fox. Fox criticized Storms and said that he was willing to fight, but the commission would not allow it.

=== AnEsonGib–Holder controversy ===
After AnEsonGib and Tayler Holder's bout, Fousey announced that the match was a majority draw; the official scorecard was 49–46, 49-46 and 50–46. Based on the scorecard, it could only have been a unanimous or split decision in favour of one of the fighters. Although Fousey was blamed by many, he disagreed with the results and said that AnEsonGib should have won. Based on the punch statistics, AnEsonGib fared substantially better and led many fans to wonder if there was a mistake or the fight was rigged. During the post-fight interview, AnEsonGib said that he was "robbed"; Holder also disagreed with the result, saying that he should have won. According to Holder, AnEsonGib weighed more than the agreed-upon limit; this forced Holder to artificially inflate his weight, presumably with weights in his pocket.

On June 14, ISKA director Tom Sconzo released a statement overturning the result and giving the victory to AnEsonGib by unanimous decision. According to Sconzo, the mistake was a "plain simple human error".
