= Bryce Hall =

American social media personality

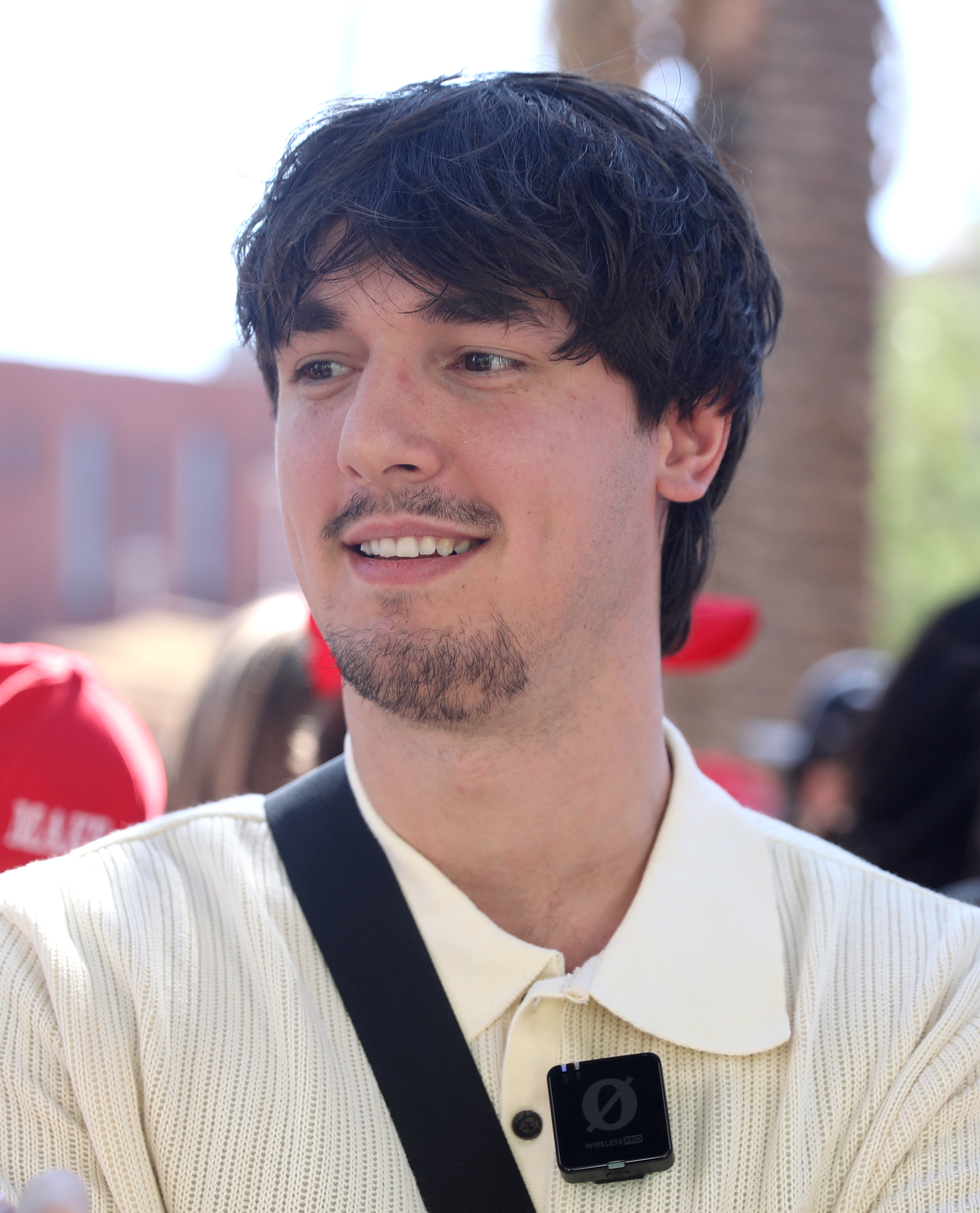
- Hall in 2024
- Born: Bryce Michael Hall; August 14, 1999 (age 27); Ellicott City, Maryland, U.S.
- Occupations: Internet personality; boxer
- Years active: 2014–present

TikTok information
- Page: brycehall
- Followers: 23.2 million

YouTube information
- Genre: Vlog
- Subscribers: 3.22 million
- Views: 391 million
- Last updated: December 23, 2025

Bryce Michael Hall (born August 14, 1999) is an American social media personality. He is most known for his videos on TikTok and YouTube. As of November 2, 2025, his TikTok account has 23.2 million followers, and his YouTube channel has 3.22 million subscribers.

He lost to Austin McBroom in an exhibition boxing match which was the headliner to the YouTubers vs. TikTokers event. He won his bare-knuckle boxing match against (3–0) professional fighter Gee Perez on BKFC 48.

He starred in the 2024 feature film Skill House, a horror film written and directed by Josh Stolberg.

== Early life ==
Hall was born on August 14, 1999, and he was raised by his mother in Ellicott City, Maryland.

== Internet career ==
=== 2014–present: TikTok breakthrough and Sway House ===
Hall started his social media career on YouNow at the age of 15. He originally started live streaming in an effort to make friends after being bullied. In late 2014, he started gaining traction on the social media platforms Vine and Musical.ly accumulating over 30,000 followers on Vine before it was shut down at the end of 2016.

He started his YouTube channel in 2015.

In 2018, Hall moved from his home in Maryland to Los Angeles to pursue his career. In 2019, he was one of the social-media celebrities featured in the documentary Jawline, which detailed his career beginnings and legal scandals with his former manager, Michael Weist.

In January 2020, Hall and five other social media personalities moved into the Sway House, a Bel Air mansion and content house owned by the talent management company TalentX Entertainment. There, they committed to creating viral content for multiple social media platforms, especially TikTok. In February 2021, TalentX and Sway House co-founder Michael Gruen confirmed that the Sway House had been discontinued.

=== 2022–present: Acting ===
In August 2021, Hall made an uncredited cameo appearance in the Netflix original film He's All That, as a high school student.

In April 2022, it was reported that Hall would star in Skill House, a horror film written and directed by Josh Stolberg and financed by Ryan Kavanaugh's Proxima Studios.

== Boxing career ==
On June 12, 2021, Hall made his boxing debut against American YouTuber Austin McBroom in an exhibition match at the Hard Rock Stadium in Miami Gardens, Florida. The billing of the bout was YouTubers vs. TikTokers as the undercard features a mixture of different YouTubers vs different TikTokers. McBroom defeated Hall via technical knockout in the third round.

=== Bare-knuckle boxing ===
Hall made his bare-knuckle boxing debut on August 11, 2023, under the Bare Knuckle Fighting Championship on BKFC 48 against professional fighter Gee Perez in at the Tingley Coliseum in Albuquerque, New Mexico. Hall defeated Perez via technical knockout (due to a doctor's stoppage) at the end of the second round.

Hall was scheduled to face Kimbo Slice Jr. on January 25, 2025, at BKFC Knucklemania V. However, Ferguson Jr. pulled out for unknown reasons and the bout was scrapped.

== Personal life ==
Hall moved to Los Angeles, California, in 2018, later becoming the creator of the Sway House. In 2020, Hall dated TikToker Addison Rae. They broke up the following year. As of 2024 onwards to 2026, he dated the Argentinian influencer Mikaela Lafuente.

Hall has stated that he is not religious.

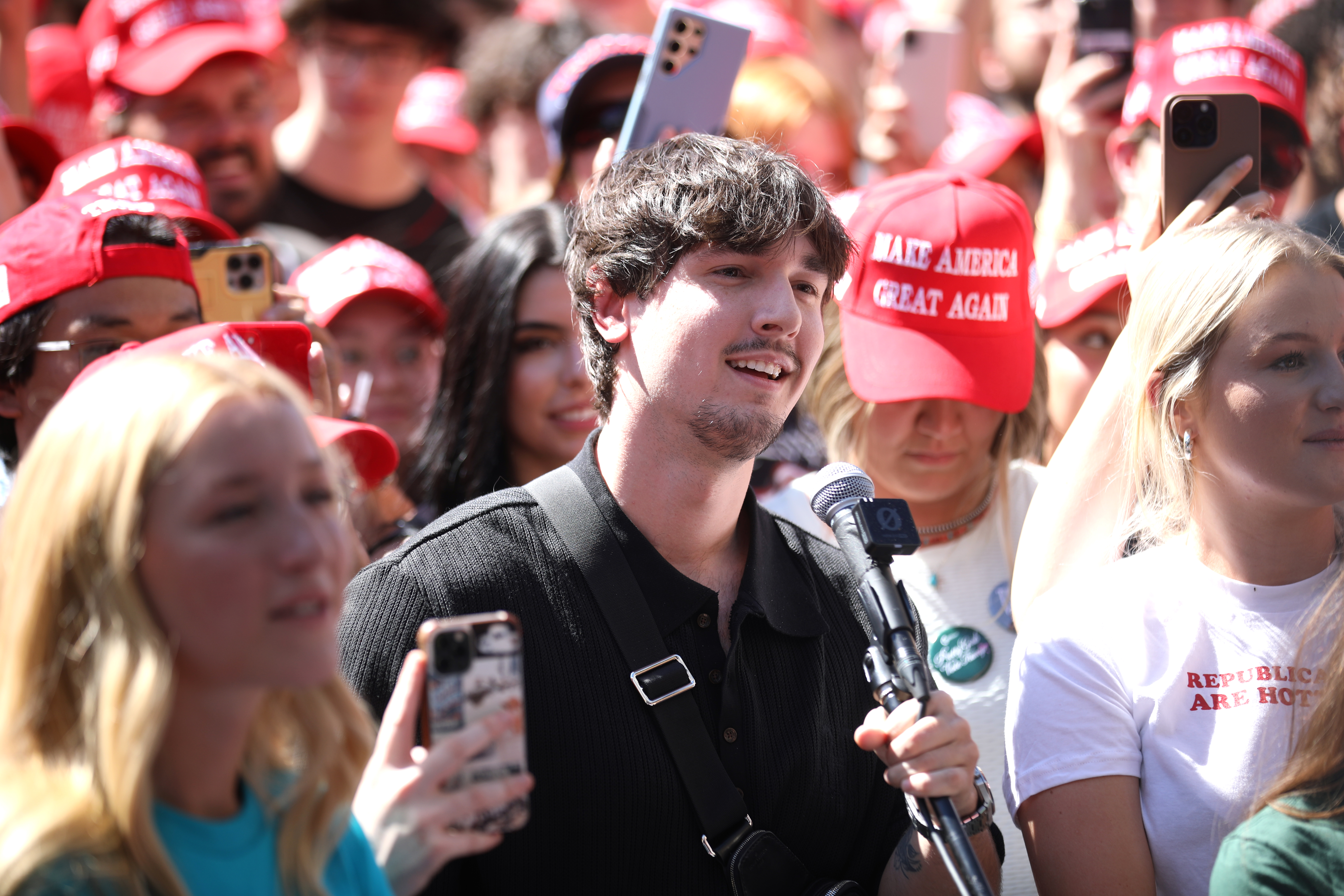
Hall speaking with attendees at the University of Arizona in Tucson, Arizona, as part of Charlie Kirk's You're Being Brainwashed tour in 2024

Hall has spoken in support of Donald Trump's 2024 presidential campaign.

== Legal problems ==
=== 2017 lawsuit ===
In 2017, Hall allegedly falsely accused his former manager Michael Weist of sexual assault. On November 1, 2017, Hall tweeted out accusing Weist of hacking his Twitter account, and he also claimed that Weist touched him inappropriately, writing "Managers who touch their clients in ways they don't wanna be touched hide the truth by hacking their Twitter accounts." In Hulu's Jawline, Weist is shown replying to a text about suing Hall by stating that he would sue his former client for $5 million. Weist filed a lawsuit against Hall for defamation. The case was settled outside of court, and Hall publicly apologized to Weist, stating "I made some harsh statements about Michael and regret making those statements, including any suggestion of sexual assault. I am sorry for what happened and I am glad it is over."

=== May 2020 arrest ===
On May 25, 2020, Hall, along with fellow TikTok star Jaden Hossler, was arrested on drug charges in Lee County, Texas. He was charged with a misdemeanor for possession of marijuana and posted $5,000 bail the same day.

=== August 2020 COVID-19-related charge ===
On August 19, 2020, Mayor of Los Angeles Eric Garcetti authorized the Los Angeles Department of Water and Power to shut off Hall's home utility services for violating the city's social distancing measures against the COVID-19 pandemic. Those measures included a ban on large gatherings that Hall allegedly violated by holding a 21st birthday celebration despite several warnings from the Los Angeles Police Department to stop holding house parties. On August 28, he was charged by the Los Angeles City Attorney with a misdemeanor for allegedly violating the Safer L.A. health order and the city's "Party House Ordinance".

=== October 2020 altercation and lawsuit ===
In October 2020, footage obtained by TMZ showed Hall and some of his friends in an altercation with an employee of the Cinco restaurant in Los Angeles. Several months later in April 2021, the restaurant co-owner, Hernan Fernando sued Hall for "battery; assault; intentional infliction of emotional distress; and engaging in acts of violence motivated by race, national origin, citizenship, immigration status and primary language."

=== October 2026 arrest ===
On October 13, 2026, Hall was arrested in Las Vegas for domestic violence.

== Filmography ==
Film
Year	Title	Role	Notes	Ref.
2019	Jawline	Himself	Documentary	
2021	He's All That	High School Student	Uncredited cameo	
2024	Skill House	TBA		

== Boxing record ==
1 fight	0 wins	1 loss
By knockout	0	1

No.	Result	Record	Opponent	Type	Round, time	Date	Location	Notes
1	Loss	0–1	Austin McBroom	TKO	3 (5), 0:45	June 12, 2021	Hard Rock Stadium, Miami Gardens, Florida, U.S.	

== Bare-knuckle boxing record ==
Professional record breakdown
1 match	1 win	0 losses
By knockout	1	0

Res.	Record	Opponent	Method	Event	Date	Round	Time	Location	Notes
Win	1–0	Gee Perez	TKO (doctor stoppage)	BKFC 48	August 11, 2023	2	5:00	Albuquerque, New Mexico, U.S.	
