= The Ace Family =

American family YouTube channel

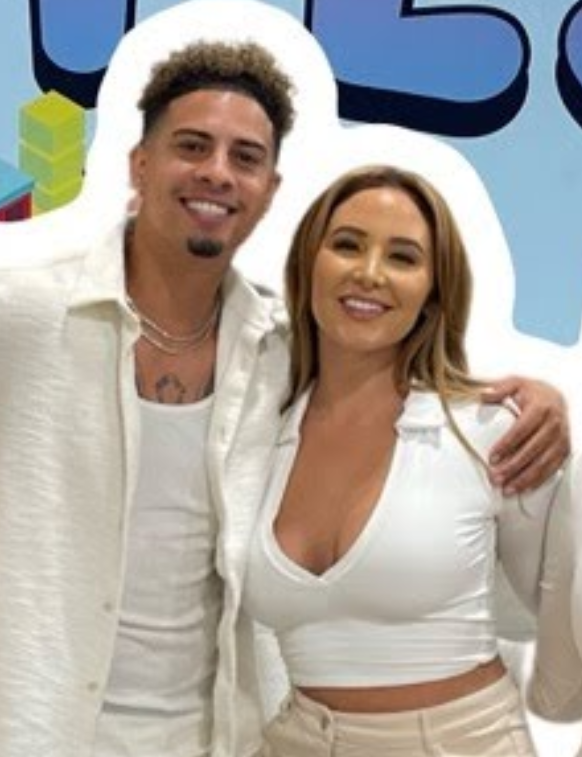
- Austin (left) and Catherine (right) in 2022
- Born: Austin McKinley McBroom; May 20, 1992 (age 34) Los Angeles, California, U.S.; Dolores Catherine Johnston Paiz; August 24, 1990 (age 36) Montreal, Quebec, Canada
- Years active: 2016–2023; 2026–present
- Children: 3 (together); 4 (Paiz) (Note: Following the couple's divorce, Paiz gave birth to a daughter, Sea'vanna, with Igor Ten in 2026.)

YouTube information
- Channel: The ACE Family
- Genres: Vlog; family; prank; challenge
- Subscribers: 18 million
- Views: 4.6 billion
- Last updated: July 11, 2026

The Ace Family is an American family YouTube channel of vloggers and influencers, consisting of parents Austin McKinley McBroom (born May 20, 1992) and Dolores Catherine Johnston Paiz (born August 24, 1990) and their three children, Elle Lively McBroom, Alaïa Marie McBroom, and Steel McBroom. As of 2026, the channel has accumulated over 18 million subscribers and 4.6 billion views.

McBroom, a former NCAA basketball player, and Paiz, a former model, created the channel in 2016 after the birth of their first child. In 2021, McBroom headlined the YouTubers vs. TikTokers boxing event in a fight against Bryce Hall. The channel announced that they would slow down on uploading videos in 2022, with their last video being posted in 2023. In 2024, McBroom and Paiz announced their divorce. They have both faced multiple controversies and lawsuits online for various incidents.

== Early lives ==
Austin McKinley McBroom was born on May 20, 1992, in Los Angeles, in the neighborhood of North Hollywood. He is multiracial, being black, white, Mexican, and Puerto Rican; his parents are Allen and Michaele McBroom. He has a younger brother, Landon. He spent a few hours in jail when he was younger from shoplifting. He graduated from Campbell Hall School in 2011. He was a point guard for the school's basketball team and, as a freshman, played on the state championship team with Jrue Holiday. As a senior, McBroom averaged 25.1 points per game. He also was a running back for the football team and a shortstop for the baseball team, receiving All-State honors in basketball and football.

McBroom attended Central Michigan University from 2011 to 2012, moving to Saint Louis University from 2012 to 2015 after his coach was fired. He appeared in the NCAA tournament twice. In his sophomore 2013–2014 season, he made 90.3 percent (56/62) of his free throws, the second highest in a single season in the history of the school. In the 2015–2016 season, he transferred to Eastern Washington University because of differences with his coach, majoring in communications. Before dating Paiz, he was in relationships with singer Jasmine V and actress Seiko Huffman.

Dolores Catherine Johnston Paiz was born August 24, 1990, in Montreal, Quebec. Her mother is from Nicaragua and her father is from Panama. She has three younger siblings: a sister, Valentina, and two brothers, Ryan and Josh. Ryan has his own YouTube channel, Through Ryan's Eyes, and has also made several appearances on The Ace Family channel. She played hockey, soccer, volleyball, and swimming whilst growing up. Paiz's family relocated to Miami when she was still a child. She originally lived with her father, but moved to Tampa to stay with her mother. Paiz moved to Los Angeles at 16 to start modeling and acting, later attending Saint Louis University. She spent a year in Shenyang in China in 2010, tutoring English, Spanish, and French. Later, she managed a venue and worked at a hedge fund in Miami. People magazine speculated that she had a relationship with Michael B. Jordan in 2014, although it was not confirmed between either party.

== Lives and careers ==
=== 2015–2023: YouTube channel and marriage ===
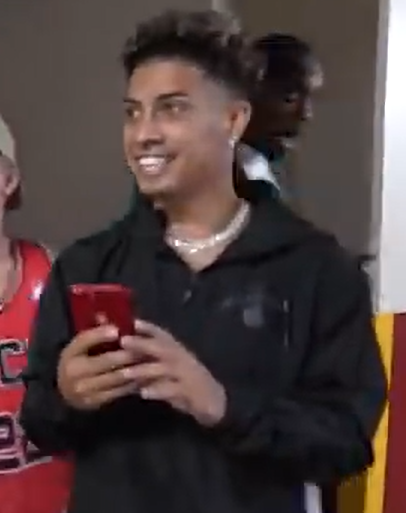
Austin McBroom in 2018

Austin McBroom and Catherine Paiz began dating in 2015; they first met at an all-white attire dinner party. They did not interact with each other besides an introduction, but McBroom asked Paiz out to dinner about a month later; their first date was a dinner at Nobu. They created the Ace Family channel in January 2016, and uploaded their first video in July, after the birth of their first child, Elle Lively McBroom in May. The channel's name came from the first letters of Austin, Catherine, and Elle. In June 2018, the Ace Family held a charity basketball tournament with YouTubers that benefited the non-profit Thirst Project. They followed it up with a second event in June 2019, in which McBroom played one-on-one basketball with Chris Brown. In July 2018, McBroom went under fire after past racist and sexist Tweets of his went viral online. He responded with a Tweet labeling those who originally dug up the Tweets as "clout chasers," which received more negative reception. The couple's second child, Alaïa Marie McBroom, was born that October. Kylie Jenner had thrown Alaïa's gender reveal party in April.

In January 2019, a video of McBroom bringing a toddler into the novelty shop Spencer's and buying her a phallic lollipop surfaced. The girl appeared to be related to Paiz, and McBroom received much backlash from it. He made a video addressing the situation, saying that he was "in so much trouble" and that "she said she was gonna steal it if I didn’t buy it, so..." Later that month, McBroom and Paiz later announced that they would be taking a brief, month-long hiatus from uploading on their channel to work on merch, their mobile app, and their four-part docuseries, Welcome to Our Life. They did not address the lollipop controversy in the announcement, instead saying that they needed a break after posting consistently for three years. In May, the channel signed with the Univision Creator Network.

In October 2019, McBroom was accused by makeup artist and vlogger Cole Carrigan, a former member of Jake Paul's Team 10 collective, of having "raped a woman while his father and security guard were in the same room, then [making] her sign a non-disclosure agreement." Carrigan, who was friends with the victim, brought up alleged text messages between the woman and McBroom and blood-stained bedding from the scene. Carrigan additionally claimed that the family paid drama YouTuber Keemstar $500,000 to keep silent about the situation. Keemstar later said that he told Carrigan that as a joke and published his side of the story, also accusing Carrigan of extortion. Paiz defended McBroom, who stated that he would be taking legal action against Carrigan for "extortion, defamation and slander."

In January 2020, the couple announced that they were expecting their third child, Steel, who was born in June. They also revealed that they had secretly married in their backyard in 2017, after their public wedding was cancelled several times. McBroom had initially proposed to Paiz in August of that year. McBroom had a short feud with Jake Paul in November 2020 after McBroom challenged Paul to a boxing match, leading Paul to retaliate with claims that Paiz is cheating on McBroom with him.

In April 2021, a lawsuit was filed against Paiz for her alleged attempted "coup" of a cosmetics company. In August 2020, Paiz signed a contract with TBL Cosmetics to create 1212, a skin care line in which Paiz would be the "public face" of. After 1212 Gateway began to make more money than anticipated, TBL claimed that, in March 2021, Paiz "conspired with her family, friends, and other under-utilized members or idle of her entourage to stage a takeover of 1212 Gateway's management" by changing all of their account passwords and shutting down their website. In April, she then threatened to dissolve 1212 Gateway and "prohibit any person from engaging in any activity related to the business unless authorized by her." Paiz also made a list of demands to TBL, including "that TBL must transfer the website to her, give her all the company's books and records, and replace the current CEO with a new one within five business days." Paiz denied all of the allegations and claimed that TBL gave her consent to perform all of the above acts, which TBL subsequently denied. TBL filed a request for a temporary restraining order against Paiz to prevent her from going through with the dissolution of the company; Paiz's attorneys wrote that the request was "moot" as she had already dissolved it.

On May 29, 2021, McBroom held a "YouTube Takeover Parade" at Rodeo Drive in Beverly Hills. It was a pre-fight party prior to his headline fight against TikToker Bryce Hall in the YouTubers vs. TikTokers boxing event the next month. McBroom and Hall had previously gotten into a physical altercation at a press conference promoting the event earlier in May. About 350–500 people convened, and the Beverly Hills Police Department was forced to close the road for about an hour-and-a-half in the afternoon. No arrests were made. The City of Beverly Hills later filed a lawsuit against McBroom and social media marketing executive Sheeraz Hasan, as McBroom or Hasan did not apply for a permit to hold the parade within city limits. In addition, The City alleged "public nuisance, violations of the Beverly Hills Municipal Code, and negligence." During the actual event, which McBroom also hosted, he won his bout against Hall. However, he and his company, Simply Greatest Productions (SGP), were sued by their partnered media company, LiveXLive, after the event underperformed in revenue when less pay-per-view packages were sold than expected. LiveXLive's attorneys said that the event failed because McBroom refused to take the LiveXLive's marketing executive's advice, which led to underpromotion. The company said that they will keep the funds from the event until SGP drops their own lawsuit against LiveXLive, which is "harming their stock price." SGP alleges in their lawsuit that LiveXLive performed actions that constituted as breach of contract and fraud by surpassing the initial budget and promising that "endorsements and sponsorship agreements would deliver a bigger profit." Tayler Holder and Nate Wyatt, two participants in the event, filed a lawsuit against SGP as well, saying that they did not receive all of the money that they were promised from being in the event. Many other influencers and fight commentators have also said online that they had not been paid; the performers, Lil Baby (who also invested in the event) and DJ Khaled, however, were paid fully. James Harden, who invested money in the event, sent legal letters to McBroom; Harden claimed that he was owed $2.4 million. The lawsuit was settled at the end of 2021, in which it was agreed that LiveXLive would pay $3 million of the revenue from the event to participants who were owed money.

The family's $10.1 million mansion in Woodland Hills, Los Angeles, was foreclosed in October 2021. In March 2022, the family announced that they would reduce the frequency of their content uploaded to YouTube, saying that they wanted to travel more and spend more time with each other. They then announced the Ace Family Fest, a one-day, ten-hour festival they described as "Disneyland meets Coachella." They sold tickets to the event in two tiers: a silver $299 ticket for three people and a VIP gold ticket, which was $499 for five people. The VIP ticket also included a meet-and-greet with the family, free viewership for McBroom's upcoming boxing event against AnEsonGib in September, and an "exclusive wedding gift." The family also said that they would choose two random VIP ticket buyers to attend McBroom's fight in person and two others to attend the family's wedding, also in September. The festival, which took place on July 9, was held in Lancaster, California. It was received very negatively, with those who attended saying that they "experienced long lines, overpriced food, and 'blistering' heat. In June 2023, the family announced that they would start streaming on Kick.

=== 2024–present: Divorce and aftermath ===
In January 2024, the couple announced their divorce through social media. Paiz wrote that their "paths as a couple have shifted and has created challenges that are irreconcilable." Paiz stated that McBroom was still her "best friend and that will never change" and McBroom said that they are both "supporting each other's future". Later that month, McBroom revealed on Snapchat that he had bought a motorhome and had parked it on the street opposite Paiz's house in order to be closer to their children. He received a neighborhood watch alert for parking illegally and it was towed in another incident. He also worked with rapper DDG to make the song "Still My Ace", which began with the lyrics "I miss you, I love you, I've been in this RV, no heat." and seemingly expressed a desire to get back together.

In November 2024, a lawsuit was filed against McBroom after he entered a woman's property without her consent, filming the interior and exterior, and posting it online with the home address clearly in view. He additionally performed a "loud and disruptive 'skit' wherein he feigned emotional distress, loudly vocalizing, [and the] scattering [of] personal effects." The woman noted that it seemed like McBroom was pretending to have moved out/been kicked out of the house, despite never having lived there. Multiple strangers showed up at her home after the publishing of the video. One of the woman's roommates had participated in an online dating show filmed by McBroom, Austin's Looking for Love, which had recently finished filming at the time, and McBroom had allegedly posted content inside the house prior to the incident. McBroom also started a podcast, Outside Voices, with his younger brother Landon in the same month.

In May 2025, on the Call Her Daddy podcast with Alex Cooper, Paiz revealed that McBroom had cheated on her with at least three, but up to twenty, women. She also released a memoir, Dolores: My Journey Home, which detailed it. McBroom took accountability in response but also alleged that Paiz knew about it and gave him permission. Paiz denied his allegation, claiming that she would never do that. In February, Paiz became engaged to Igor Ten, a tattoo artist, after meeting him on a retreat to Brazil. They married in September; McBroom's invitation was rescinded after he made comments on his stream suggesting that the marriage was rushed for immigration reasons, as Ten was from Brazil and required a visa to stay in the U.S. Paiz had her fourth child, Sea'vanna, the first with Ten, in July 2026.
