= Farbman =

Farbman is a surname. Notable people with the surname include:

- Michael S. Farbman (c.1880–1933), Russian writer
- Nat Farbman (1907–1988), American photographer
- Phil Farbman (1924–1996), American basketball player
- Rafail Farbman (1893–1966), Russian Jewish revolutionary and Bolshevik
- Zeev Farbman (born 1979), Israeli entrepreneur
