= Charli D'Amelio =

American social media personality (born 2004)

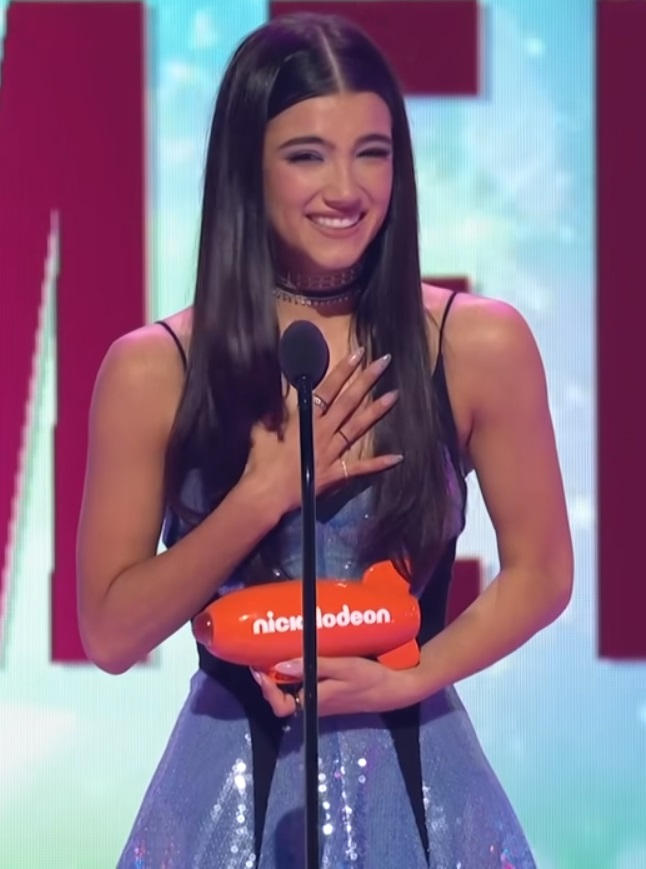
- D'Amelio accepting an award at the 2022 Nickelodeon Kids' Choice Awards
- Born: Charli Grace D'Amelio; May 1, 2004 (age 22); Norwalk, Connecticut, U.S.
- Occupations: Influencer; dancer
- Years active: 2019–present
- Relatives: Dixie D'Amelio (sister)

Instagram information
- Page: charlidamelio
- Followers: 40.2 million

TikTok information
- Page: charlidamelio
- Followers: 159.4 million

YouTube information
- Channel: charli d'amelio
- Genre: Vlog
- Subscribers: 8.94 million
- Views: 401 million
- Last updated: March 12, 2026
- Website: charlidamelio.com

Charli Grace D'Amelio (/dəˈmɪlioʊ/ də-MIL-ee-oh; born May 1, 2004) is an American social media personality and dancer. She was a competitive dancer for over a decade before she came to prominence in late 2019, when she began posting dance videos on the video-sharing platform TikTok and joined The Hype House that same year. D'Amelio quickly amassed a large following and subsequently became the most-followed creator on the platform from March 2020 to June 2022. With over 158 million followers, she is the second most-followed person on TikTok as of 2026.

D'Amelio made her feature film debut with a voice role in the 2020 animated film StarDog and TurboCat. She starred in the Hulu reality series The D'Amelio Show (2021–2023) with her family and co-led the Snap Original reality show Charli vs. Dixie (2021–2022), with her sister. In 2022, D'Amelio won the thirty-first season of the dance competition series Dancing with the Stars alongside Mark Ballas. She made her Broadway debut in the ensemble of & Juliet in October 2024.

Her other endeavours include two books, a podcast, a nail polish collection, a mattress, a makeup line, a clothing line, and a multi-product company. D'Amelio was the highest-earning TikTok female personality in 2019 and the highest-earning personality on the app in 2022, according to Forbes, and is often described as "TikTok's biggest star."

== Early life ==
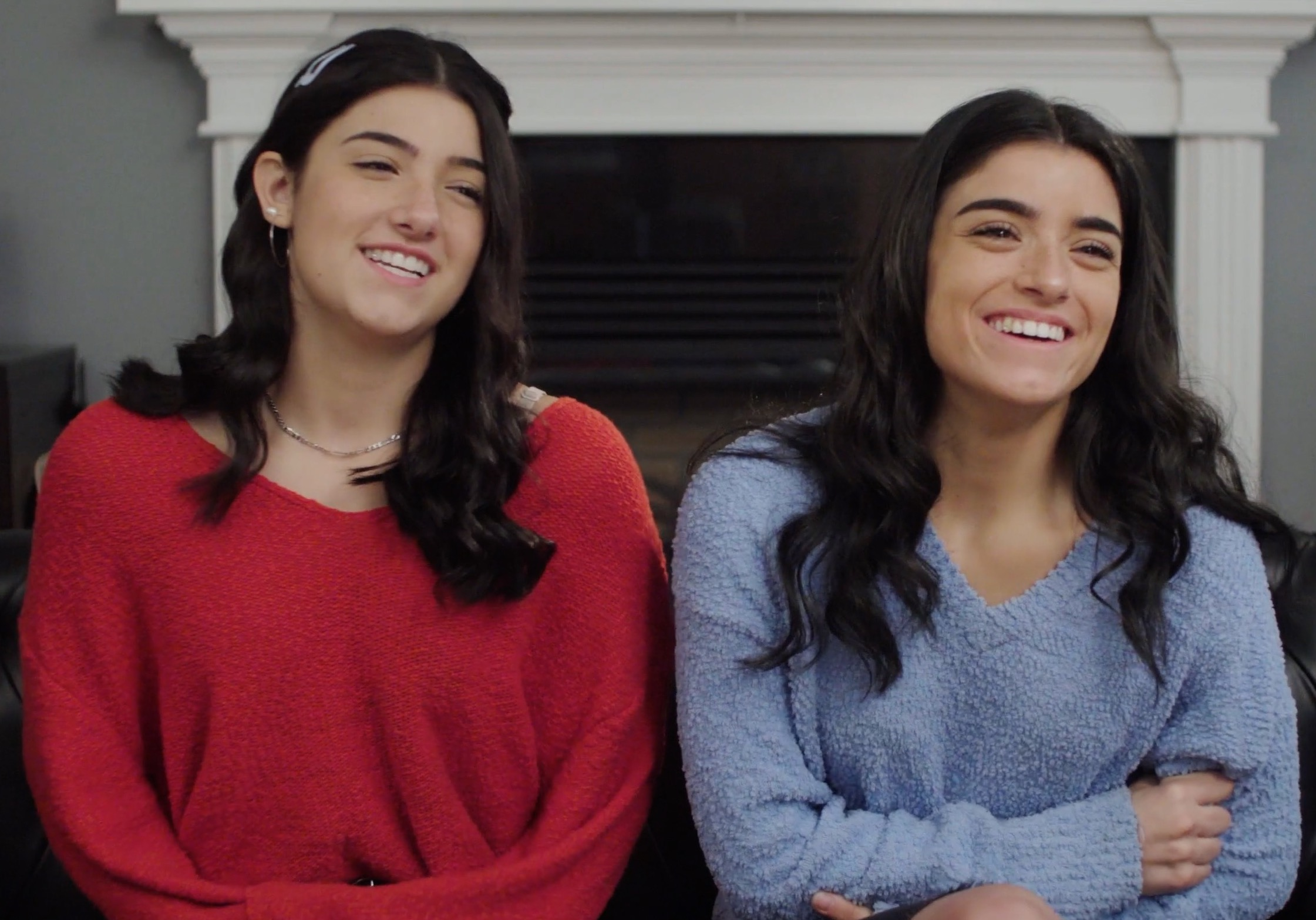
D'Amelio (left) with her sister Dixie (right) in February 2020

Charli Grace D'Amelio was born in Norwalk, Connecticut, on May 1, 2004, the daughter of photographer and former model Heidi D'Amelio and business owner and former Republican Connecticut Senate candidate Marc D'Amelio. Her mother is Cajun and is from Louisiana. She has an older sister, Dixie, who is also a social media personality.

She began dancing at the age of three, and was a competitive dancer for over 10 years prior to starting her TikTok career in 2019.

She formerly attended the private King School in Stamford, Connecticut, but began attending school virtually following her social media popularity.

== Career ==
=== 2019–2021: rise to prominence on TikTok ===
D'Amelio first began posting on TikTok in May 2019 with a lip syncing video alongside her friend. Her first video to gain traction, a side-by-side video (known on the platform as a "duet") with user Move With Joy, was posted in July 2019. D'Amelio has expressed confusion regarding her rise to popularity, telling Variety, "I consider myself a normal teenager that a lot of people watch, for some reason. It doesn't make sense in my head, but I'm working on understanding it." Since then, her content has mainly consisted of videos dancing to trending songs on the platform. In October 2019, she gained further exposure for her videos performing a dance called the "Renegade" to the K Camp song "Lottery". She was subsequently credited with popularizing the dance on social media, while also being incorrectly credited with creating the dance, and was referred to as the "CEO of Renegade" by TikTok users. Following a New York Times profile of dancer Jalaiah Harmon revealing her as the original creator of the dance, D'Amelio received online backlash for not crediting Harmon, and began regularly crediting the creators of the dances she performed. She joined the collaborative TikTok content house The Hype House in November 2019 alongside her sister, Dixie.

In late 2019, former Sony Music executive Barbara Jones signed D'Amelio to her management company, Outshine Talent, and in January 2020, she signed with United Talent Agency along with the rest of her family. Bebe Rexha invited D'Amelio to perform alongside her during her opening performance for the Jonas Brothers in November 2019. That same month, she began posting on her YouTube vlog channel.

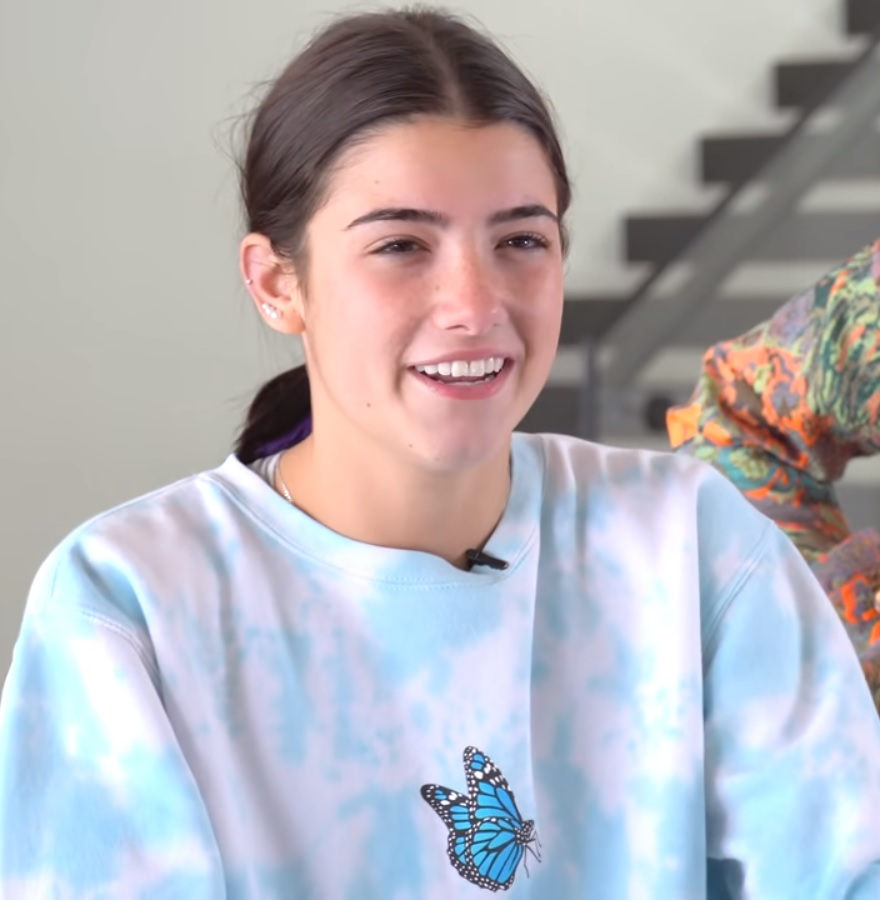
D'Amelio in a hair makeover video in 2020

In February 2020, D'Amelio appeared in a Super Bowl commercial for Sabra hummus along with other celebrities. In March 2020, she and her sister partnered with UNICEF for an anti-bullying campaign and made an appearance in the Nickelodeon television special #KidsTogether: The Nickelodeon Town Hall, hosted by Kristen Bell. That same month, she partnered with Procter & Gamble to create the #DistanceDance challenge campaign on TikTok with the goal of encouraging social distancing during the COVID-19 pandemic, which garnered praise from Ohio Governor Mike DeWine. For her involvement in the campaign, she was nominated for a Streamy Award for Social Good Campaign. She also became the most-followed TikTok user, displacing American social media personality Loren Gray, and the first TikTok user to earn 50 million followers. D'Amelio appeared in the ABC television special The Disney Family Singalong during the performance of "We're All In This Together" from High School Musical in April 2020.

In May 2020, D'Amelio and her sister announced a podcast deal with Ramble Podcast Network, and both were included in the celebrity lineup for the television special Graduate Together: America Honors the High School Class of 2020, hosted by LeBron James. Also that month, she left the Hype House. D'Amelio starred as Tinker in the June 2020 United States release of the 2019 animated children's film StarDog and TurboCat, marking her first role in a feature film. That same month, she and her sister partnered with Morphe Cosmetics to launch Morphe 2, a makeup line. Charli and Dixie also launched a nail polish collection called Coastal Craze with Orosa Beauty in August 2020.

Later that month, D'Amelio announced her debut book, titled Essentially Charli: The Ultimate Guide to Keeping It Real, which was released on December 1, 2020. The book was published by Abrams Books. It covered topics of identity, cyberbullying, social media, and body image as well as D'Amelio's childhood and family life. The book became a New York Times bestseller.

Dunkin' Donuts offered a limited-time drink on their menu dedicated to D'Amelio and based on her "go-to" order called "The Charli" in September 2020. D'Amelio and her sister also designed limited-edition fleece sweatshirts for Hollister, released in September 2020. She joined Triller, a rival platform to TikTok, later that month, in the midst of a potential US ban on TikTok. She also made an appearance in Jennifer Lopez and Maluma's music video for their singles "Pa' Ti + Lonely". D'Amelio earned a 2021 Guinness World Record for having the most TikTok followers that same month. D'Amelio starred in the music video for the Bebe Rexha single, "Baby I'm Jealous", in October 2020. She became the face of teen-oriented banking services company, Step. Later that month, she was nominated for three awards, including Creator of the Year, at the 10th Streamy Awards.

In November 2020, D'Amelio was the first user to surpass 100 million followers on TikTok. She also earned a nomination for Social Star at the 46th People's Choice Awards. In December 2020, she was featured in an episode of the Facebook Messenger series Here for It With Avani Gregg, and also won the award for Breakout Creator at the 10th Streamy Awards. In March 2021, D'Amelio and Pura Vida Bracelets released a bracelet range, called the "Charli D'Amelio Pack". She starred in the music video for Lil Huddy's song "America's Sweetheart" in April. In May, D'Amelio and her sister co-created and became the face of Social Tourist, an apparel brand under Hollister, as part of a multi-year partnership with Abercrombie & Fitch, and partnered with Simmons Bedding Company to design and release the Charlie & Dixie x Simmons Mattress. The following month, she and Invisalign released a limited-edition case for the company's dental aligners. In July 2021, she co-starred in the digital campaign for the US arm of Mexican snack brand, Takis, with gamer Ninja.

=== 2022–present: reality series and other projects ===
D'Amelio starred alongside her family in the Hulu docuseries The D'Amelio Show, which premiered in September 2021. The series was popular among other shows at the time; however, it was cancelled in June 2024 after a three-season run. The program won an MTV Movie & TV Award for Best Unscripted Series. Later that year, she starred with her sister in the Snap Original web reality competition show Charli vs. Dixie, which premiered on November 13, 2021. The series follows the sisters compete against each other in various challenges and tasks, in order to win a cash prize of US$50,000 that goes to a charity of the winner's choice. D'Amelio participated for UNICEF. Charli vs. Dixie was renewed for a second season, which premiered in November 2022.

In January 2022, D'Amelio made a guest appearance in the second episode of Netflix's Hype House, a reality series based on the TikTok collective of the same name. The following month, she and her family became brand ambassadors and advisors for software company Lightricks, under an equity deal. In March, D'Amelio appeared in the ABC special Step Into...The Movies with Derek and Julianne Hough; she performed opposite dancer Derek Hough in a recreation of the Dirty Dancing (1987) sequence. In April, it was announced that she would star as the lead in Village Roadshow Pictures and Ryan Kavanaugh's upcoming supernatural thriller film Home School, eyed as the first installment of a potential eight-film franchise. Directed by F. Javier Gutiérrez, the film is executive produced by D'Amelio's parents and her sister, Dixie. Production began in July. In May, D'Amelio guest-voiced as herself in "Meat Is Murder", an episode of the animated sitcom The Simpsons. Marcus Gibson of Bubbleblabber stated that D'Amelio's role "felt forced for the sake of introducing newcomers to [TikTok]". The following month, D'Amelio released a fragrance named "Born Dreamer", exclusively via Ulta Beauty.

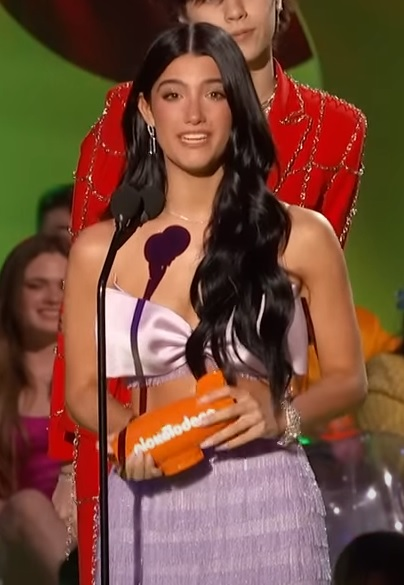
D'Amelio at the 2023 Kids' Choice Awards

In August 2022, D'Amelio and her mother, Heidi D'Amelio, were announced as celebrity participants for the thirty-first season of the dance competition series Dancing with the Stars, the first family members to compete against each other on the show. Charli was partnered with Mark Ballas and won the competition.

In October 2022, she fronted the Prada Linear Rossa fall/winter 2022 campaign. Later that month, D'Amelio released her debut single, "If You Ask Me To" with an accompanying music video. The song—a piano ballad about teenage heartbreak—first premiered during the second-season finale of The D'Amelio Show. It reached the top 40 on the Billboard Adult Pop Airplay chart. D'Amelio performed on select dates of the Dancing with the Stars Live 2023 concert tour, which spanned from January to March 2023. She co-hosted the 36th Nickelodeon Kids' Choice Awards with American football commentator Nate Burleson on March 4, 2023. In June, she was announced as the brand ambassador of Tamagotchi Uni, a model of the Tamagotchi digital pet. By the end of that month, she appeared as a guest judge on Is It Cake, Too?, the second season of the Netflix game show Is It Cake?. In September, along with other celebrities, D'Amelio partnered with Meta Platforms to introduce an AI chatbot named Coco, a "dance enthusiast", modeled after her.

In February 2024, she co-starred with Ben Affleck in Dunkin' Donuts' commercial "Who is Ben?", which premiered during the 2024 Grammy Awards ceremony ad break. In May, she became the new ambassador of Garnier. D'Amelio made her Broadway debut with the jukebox musical & Juliet. She is currently playing Charmian, a "dance-heavy ensemble [role]", for a run at the Stephen Sondheim Theatre, from October 29, 2024, through September 7, 2025. In April 2025, D'Amelio fronted Kate Spade New York's spring-summer 2025 campaign, titled "To The Ones Who Carry Us, with rapper Ice Spice.

== Public image ==
D'Amelio was frequently referred to in the media as "TikTok's biggest star" in 2020. Taylor Lorenz of The New York Times called D'Amelio the "reigning queen" of TikTok. Trey Taylor of The Face called her and her sister Dixie the "CEOs of TikTok". In an article for The Washington Post, Travis M. Andrews called her "[TikTok's] undisputed ruler". Cassidy George of The New Yorker called her the "face of TikTok". Much of her appeal has been attributed to her content being seen as relatable and authentic. Marc Faddoul, an artificial intelligence researcher at the University of California, Berkeley, credited her status as a "median user" and a "safe recommendation choice that can generate engagement across the board" as reasons for her fame.

Mel Magazine's Joseph Longo called her "one of the first polarizing figures on the video app—the embodiment of the strange, precarious and unpredictable new world of Gen Z online fame", noting that social media users criticized her as being "basic", "cringeworthy", and "overhyped". In regard to D'Amelio's early popularity, Rachel Monroe of The Atlantic wrote, "As Charli's follower count grew, her popularity acquired a reflexive quality; essentially, she became a meme for other TikTokers to react to. There was a flurry of 'I don't get why Charli is so popular' posts, followed by backlash-to-the-backlash videos tagged #teamcharli and #unproblematicqueen." Writing for Vanity Fair, Carino Chocano called her the "face" of "Straight TikTok", a colloquialism used to describe the mainstream part of TikTok, with "straight" referencing the fact that many of the users who make up "Straight TikTok" are heterosexual.

She appeared on both the Forbes 30 Under 30 list and on Fortune's 40 Under 40 list in 2020, making her the youngest person to appear on Fortune's list. Fashion search engine Lyst placed D'Amelio at eighth on their annual Power Dressers list, which identifies the most influential public figures in fashion based on the company's search, sales, and social media metrics, in 2020. The company also listed D'Amelio second on their collaborative Next 20 list with Highsnobiety, which determines the most prominent "breakout cultural pioneers" in fashion using search metrics and sales. In 2021, she was included on the Time100 Next list, an extension to the Time 100 list, and in Teen Vogue's Young Hollywood Class of 2021. D'Amelio was ranked number six on Forbes's Top Creators 2025 listicle.

In July 2025, D’Amelio was named to the inaugural TIME100 Creators list, which recognized 100 of the most influential digital creators from around the world.

Other TikTok users, including Lisa Beverly and Ellie Zeiler, became notable on the platform for their resemblance to D'Amelio.

=== Online controversies ===
In November 2020, the D'Amelio sisters garnered backlash after the premiere of "Our First Mystery Guest", the inaugural episode of their YouTube series, Dinner with the D'Amelios, in which they and internet personality James Charles eat a dinner prepared by personal chef Aaron May.

Users on social media accused the sisters of exhibiting "rude" behavior towards May, because Charli, the critics said, made faces as she described the meal, became nauseated after consuming one of the dish's ingredients, a snail, and asked for "dino nuggets". She also was criticized by users and Charles himself, for complaining about not having yet attained received 100 million followers on the one-year anniversary of her earning one million, for which users. Following the backlash, D'Amelio lost over one million followers on TikTok in less than one day. Days after the video was posted, she addressed the situation in an Instagram Live video, where she apologized and told viewers, "You can hate on me for whatever I've done, but the fact that all of this is happening because of a misunderstanding...I just feel like that's not okay," in response to violent threats she had received. May defended the sisters in an interview, stating, "Those girls are the greatest, I love them. It was all fun and games." Charles similarly tweeted out in their defense, further comparing the controversy to the conflict which broke out between him and Tati Westbrook a year prior. Rebecca Jennings of Vox called the controversy "cruel and unnecessary", while Alice Ophelia and Faye Maidment of Dazed attributed it to misogyny.

D'Amelio faced backlash in December 2020 after it was revealed that she and a number of other social media personalities, including Cole Hudson, had been vacationing at Atlantis Paradise Island in the Bahamas during the COVID-19 pandemic while cases in her and her family's residence of Los Angeles surged, shortly after having publicly suggested that not staying home during the pandemic was "inconsiderate".

D'Amelio was also accused of buying her social media followers, after another user uploaded a video stating that some of her followers were dummy accounts that had posted no content, and did not include D'Amelio among the accounts they followed.

== Other ventures ==
=== D'Amelio Brands ===
In September 2022, D'Amelio and her family announced a new project, D'Amelio Brands, which would launch and operate its own brands, focused on fashion, beauty, and lifestyle. As co-founders, D'Amelio, her mother, and her sister Dixie "share creative input for the [company's] marketing and product development". The venture also announced a $6 million seed round which included Fanatics CEO Michael Rubin, entrepreneur Richard Rosenblatt, Apple Senior Vice President of Services Eddy Cue, and Lionsgate CEO Jon Feltheimer as investors. The company released D'Amelio Footwear in May 2023. Multiple pop-ups of the footwear line have been run since its launch, across the United States. In August 2023, D'Amelio Brands received $5 million in funding via a strategic investment by VC firm Fifth Growth Fund, to expand to the food and beverage sector, on the company's valuation of $100 million, at the time. The flavored popcorn range, Be Happy Snacks, was released to Walmart's retail stores and webstore in late October. Unlike D'Amelio Footwear, which is sold direct-to-consumer, the company partnered with Walmart for the snack brand as "[it] just seemed to be something that would not be as successful going exclusively [DTC]". Other ventures under D'Amelio Brands include skincare line ZitsAllRight and merchandise line Dam Fam Merch.

=== Investments ===
D'Amelio has participated as an investor in equity funding rounds of Step. In March 2022, she and her family launched their own venture capital fund, 444 Capital, with Dough Renert and Jeff Beacher as partners. The $25 million fund predominantly invests in women and minority-led startups across various sectors, in early or later stages. Four investments were announced in March 2023.

=== Activism and philanthropy ===
Following D'Amelio's meet-and-greet in November 2019, she and her family donated the money earned from ticket sales to a special needs fundraiser.

In April 2020, D'Amelio donated $50,000 to Norwalk Hospital in her hometown of Norwalk, Connecticut, to help secure critical supplies for the hospital's staff amid the COVID-19 pandemic.

D'Amelio has openly expressed support for the Black Lives Matter movement; during the George Floyd protests in 2020, she posted a video on TikTok decrying Floyd's murder.

In December 2020, D'Amelio partnered with TikTok to donate $100,000 to the American Dance Movement, an organization which helps provide access to dance education in the United States, as part of Giving Tuesday.

== Personal life ==
D'Amelio has stated that she suffers from an eating disorder. She has also been vocal about her experiences with body shaming. In an anti-bullying campaign for UNICEF, she said, "Some of the most hurtful comments that I read about myself online are about my body shape, my body type, which hits close to home because I struggled a lot with body image, body dysmorphia, [and] bad eating habits." D'Amelio has been diagnosed with ADHD and OCD.

D'Amelio was in a relationship with social media influencer Cole Hudson from December 2019 to April 2020. She was in a relationship with Landon Barker from July 2022 to February 2024.

== Filmography ==
=== Film ===
List of film appearances, with year released, film title and role shown
Year	Title	Role	Notes	Ref.
2020	StarDog and TurboCat	Tinker	Voice role	
2025	Hurry Up Tomorrow	Dancer		

=== Television (as herself) ===
List of television appearances, with year released, series title and role shown
Year	Title	Notes	Ref.
2020	#KidsTogether: The Nickelodeon Town Hall	Television special	
2020	The Disney Family Singalong	Television special	
2020	Graduate Together: America Honors the High School Class of 2020	Television special	
2020	Here for It with Avani Gregg	Episode: "Have You Ever Been a Bully?"	
2021	Earth Day! The Musical	Web special	
2021	Celebrity Family Feud	Contestant; episode: "JoJo Siwa vs. Charli and Dixie D'Amelio and Ross Mathews vs. Loni Love"	
2021–present	The D'Amelio Show	Main role; streaming docuseries	
2021–present	Charli Vs. Dixie	Co-lead; web reality series	
2022	Hype House	Guest appearance; episode: "Love and Social Media"	
2022	Step Into...The Movies With Derek and Julianne Hough	Television special	
2022	The Simpsons	Voice role; episode: "Meat Is Murder" (season 33)	
2022	Dancing with the Stars	Winner; season 31	
2023	Is It Cake?	Guest judge; episode: "So Fresh and So Cake"	
2024	Selling Sunset	Appearance	

=== Music videos ===
List of music videos, with year released and artist(s) shown
Year	Title	Artist(s)	Ref.
2020	"Baby, I'm Jealous"	Bebe Rexha featuring Doja Cat	
2020	"Pa' Ti + Lonely"	Jennifer Lopez and Maluma	
2021	"F***BOY"	Dixie D'Amelio	
2022	"If You Ask Me To"	Herself	

== Discography ==
=== Singles ===
List of singles with year released and selected chart positions
Title	Year	Peak chart positions	
Title	Year	US Adult	NZ Hot
"If You Ask Me To"	2022	33	28

== Awards and nominations ==
List of awards and nominations, with organization, year, nominated work, and result shown
Organization	Year	Category	Nominated work	Result	Ref.
People's Choice Awards	2020	The Social Star of 2020	Herself	Nominated	
People's Choice Awards	2021	The Social Star of 2021	Herself	Nominated	
People's Choice Awards	2022	The Competition Contestant of 2022	Herself	Nominated	
People's Choice Awards	2022	The Social Star of 2022	Herself	Nominated	
Streamy Awards	2020	Breakout Creator	Herself	Won	
Streamy Awards	2020	Creator of the Year	Herself	Nominated	
Streamy Awards	2020	Social Good Campaign	#DistanceDance	Nominated	
Streamy Awards	2021	Creator of the Year	Herself	Nominated	
Streamy Awards	2022	Creator of the Year	Herself	Nominated	
Streamy Awards	2022	Lifestyle	Herself	Won	
Streamy Awards	2023	Creator of the Year	Herself	Nominated	
Streamy Awards	2023	Lifestyle	Herself	Nominated	
Kids' Choice Awards	2021	Favorite Female Social Star	Herself	Won	
Kids' Choice Awards	2022	Favorite Female Creator	Herself	Won	
Kids' Choice Awards	2023	Favorite Female Creator	Herself	Won	
Kids' Choice Awards	2024	Favorite Female Creator	Herself	Nominated	
Kids' Choice Awards	2025	Favorite Female Creator	Herself	Nominated	
MTV Movie & TV Awards	2021	Breakthrough Social Star	Herself	Nominated	
MTV Millennial Awards	2021	Global Creator	Herself	Nominated	

List of world records, with publication, year, name of the record, and name of the record holder
Publication	Year	World record	Record holder	R. Status	Ref.
Guinness World Records	2021	Most followers on TikTok	Charli D'Amelio	Record	
Guinness World Records	2021	First person to reach 50 million followers on TikTok	Charli D'Amelio	Record	
Guinness World Records	2021	First person to reach 100 million followers on TikTok	Charli D'Amelio	Record	
