= Barbara Bradley =

Barbara Bradley may refer to:

- Barbara Bradley Hagerty, American journalist
- Barbara Bradley Baekgaard (born 1939), American fashion entrepreneur
