= Enlight Quickshot =

Photo editing app

- Developer: Lightricks
- Release: August 2017
- Type: Photo Editor
- License: Proprietary
- Website: quickshotapp.com

Enlight Quickshot is a photo editing app designed to simplify the editing process. It was made by Lightricks.

== History ==
Enlight Quickshot was released in August 2017. It is available as a free version with in-app-purchases. Quickshot has had over 1 million downloads.

The app originally featured four AI-powered modes with auto adjustment features as well as a photo gallery with batch editing tools. The four shooting modes were: HDR, Quickshot, Photo, and Strobe.

The app's name derives from the “quickshot” mode which automatically aligned photos, fixed the lighting and previewed filters before the picture was taken.

== Editing Features ==
Editing options are Magic which is a retouch feature and Looks that can change the picture with one click. It was revealed influencer Tupi Saravia was using Quickshot's most well-known feature, the Sky feature to insert the same cloud formation image into her pictures. As a result of the publicity, she started working for Quickshot as a brand ambassador.
