= Meat Is Murder (The Simpsons) =

- The Simpsons episode
- Episode no.: Season 33; Episode 21
- Directed by: Bob Anderson
- Written by: Michael Price
- Production code: UABF13
- Original air date: May 15, 2022

Guest appearances
- Nicholas Braun as "Cousin" Greg Hirsch; Charli D'Amelio as herself; Susan Egan as Singing Tree; Seth Green as Mav Redfield; John Lithgow as Augustus "Gus" Redfield; Edi Patterson as Jessica; Krysten Ritter as Sheila Redfield; Paul F. Tompkins as Colby Redfield

Episode chronology
← Previous "Marge the Meanie"	Next → "Poorhouse Rock"
- The Simpsons season 33

"Meat Is Murder" is the twenty-first and penultimate episode of the thirty-third season of the American animated television series The Simpsons, and the 727th episode overall. Parodying Succession and The Founder, it aired in the United States on Fox on May 15, 2022. The episode was directed by Bob Anderson and written by Michael Price.

In this episode, Augustus Redfield buys Krusty Burger for revenge and invites his former business partner Grampa to join his company's board of directors, but he is used by Redfield and his children as they fight to gain control of their company. Nicholas Braun, Seth Green, John Lithgow, Edi Patterson, Krysten Ritter, and Paul F. Tompkins guest starred. Social media personality Charli D'Amelio appeared as herself. The episode received mixed reviews.

== Plot ==
In 1972, Krusty the Clown is kicked out of a coffee house for not being funny enough and seeks work elsewhere. He finds himself the new mascot of Grampa and his friend Gus Redfield's fast-food restaurant Worth-A-Try, which becomes a success after Krusty is hired. After he demands more money the two fire him, and he opens his own fast-food franchise. Gus vows revenge on him while Grampa cowardly retreats.

In the present, Krusty is celebrating the 50th anniversary of his chain, Krusty Burger, which everyone in town attends. When Lisa asks why Grampa is upset, he explains that every Simpson is cursed to fail at everything they try, but Lisa vows to break the curse somehow. Meanwhile, Krusty is about to announce a new burger when a now elderly Gus, who is now rich and runs his own corporation called Redstar, buys Krusty's entire franchise, thus leaving Krusty broke. Gus then reunites with Grampa and then asks for him to be his new partner which he happily accepts.

Gus takes Grampa and Lisa to his home where he introduces them to his children Colby, Mav, and Sheila. Sheila and Lisa bond over their shared love of nature. She convinces Lisa to help her vote her father out of their company so she can gain control and turn Redstar into Greenstar, an environmental company. Lisa agrees to convince Grampa to vote Gus out of the company.

Lisa accompanies Grampa to the board meeting. Grampa, the Redfield family, German politician Angela Merkel, businessman Kevin O'Leary, and TikTok star Charli D'Amelio prepare to cast their votes. Sheila and her brothers reveal their plan to the board members to remove their father from the company and take control. While the siblings vote to oust him, the other members vote against it, including Grampa, who is grateful to Gus for offering him the partnership. However, Gus reveals that he had already suspected his children were plotting against him and only brought Grampa to protect him from the vote; he then removes all three of his kids from his will and reveals he never truly cared for Grampa.

As payback, Grampa then turns his vote into a long and nonsensical story to nullify it from the board meeting, thus leaving the vote tied and the company in ruins. Losing interest in the conflict, Lisa and Grampa leave the meeting. On the bus home, Lisa apologizes to Grampa for being unable to break the Simpson curse; but he assures her that despite all his bad decisions, he is lucky to have her as his granddaughter.

Meanwhile, at a kibbutz in Israel, Krusty is being congratulated on his success in growing potatoes by Naharai, a fellow kibbutznik. The Redstar lawyer appears in a helicopter revealing Gus's plot and offers Krusty his franchise back. Krusty then flies back to the U.S. with her, happy to be a clown again, while Naharai muses that Krusty was the least funny person on the kibbutz.

== Production ==
Nicholas Braun reprised his role as "Cousin" Greg Hirsch from the television series Succession. John Lithgow guest starred as Augustus "Gus" Redfield. Lithgow previously appeared as himself in the thirtieth season episode "I'm Just a Girl Who Can't Say D'oh." Seth Green guest starred as Mav Redfield. Green previously appeared as another character in the couch gag of the twenty-eighth season episode "The Cad and the Hat." Edi Patterson was cast as Jessica, Krysten Ritter was cast as Sheila Redfield, and Paul F. Tompkins was cast as Colby Redfield. Social media personality Charli D'Amelio appeared as herself.

== Cultural references ==
The episode is a parody of both the television series Succession and the 2016 film The Founder. In addition to Nicholas Braun reprising his role as "Cousin" Greg Hirsch, Augustus Redfield's company RedStar Corporation is a reference to the Succession company Waystar RoyCo.

== Reception ==
=== Viewing figures ===
The episode earned a 0.31 rating with 1.00 million viewers, which was the third most watched show on Fox that night.

=== Critical response ===
Tony Sokol of Den of Geek stated "’Meat is Murder’ is a well-balanced offering served fast. It is moving and didactic, but clever and underhanded. The story has depth, double-dealing, and a solid third act. There is an open 'No Exit' corporate loophole, because the vote will forever remain deadlocked. But this makes it more sadistically subversive than a successful succession."

Marcus Gibson of Bubbleblabber gave the episode an 6.5/10 stating, "Overall, 'Meat is Murder' offers an intriguing part of Grampa and Krusty's early years as restaurant workers. Unfortunately, that's the only thing keeping this business from completely falling apart. Aside from the flashback scenes and guest stars, the episode falls into the usual corporation trappings like the other shows but doesn't have an investing brand to sell to its customers. It's not the worst thing this season delivered, but it's also nothing for me to remember compared to its other episodes. Hopefully, The Simpsons will end the season on a positive note with next week's finale."
