= StarDog and TurboCat =

2019 animated film

- US release poster
- Directed by: Ben Smith
- Screenplay by: Ben Smith
- Produced by: Ben Smith; Jan Rogowski
- Starring: Luke Evans; Nick Frost; Gemma Arterton; Bill Nighy; Charli D'Amelio
- Music by: Heather Fenoughty
- Production companies: Head Gear Films; Screen Yorkshire; Particular Crowd; Red Star 3D
- Distributed by: Kaleidoscope Film Distribution (United Kingdom); Viva Kids (United States)
- Release dates: 6 December 2019 (United Kingdom); 21 May 2020 (United States)
- Running time: 90 minutes
- Country: United Kingdom
- Language: English
- Box office: $585,443

StarDog and TurboCat is a 2019 British animated superhero film produced by Head Gear Films and Screen Yorkshire and distributed by Kaleidoscope Film Distribution and animated by Red Star 3D. Originally titled SpaceDog and TurboCat, the film was directed and written by Ben Smith and features the voices of Nick Frost, Luke Evans, Gemma Arterton, Bill Nighy, Ben Bailey Smith, Charli D'Amelio and Cory English.

It received mixed reviews from critics, who generally approved of the film's animation but considered the film itself unsophisticated.

== Plot ==
In 1969, a Golden Retriever named Buddy is launched into space with a backpack in a space capsule by his owner, David. However, soon after leaving Earth, the capsule malfunctions and shocks Buddy, mutating his DNA and giving him superpowers before flying out of orbit, leaving Buddy frozen and floating in space.

50 years later, the capsule reenters Earth's atmosphere, causing Buddy to crash land back on Earth in the fictional town of Glenfield, where he awakes in a dumpster. After Buddy attempts to speak with a human, he is met with frightened and angry reactions from the townspeople, to the confusion of Buddy. He discovers that the capsule has gone missing. He sees a police truck and chases it for several blocks until it stops at the police station. Buddy finds a caged dog called Victor in the trunk of the truck, who asks Buddy to help free him. Officer Peck then exits the vehicle and takes Victor into the station, which is connected to the local animal pound.

Buddy runs into a nearby alley, where he is introduced to a tuxedo cat named Felix (known by his superhero alias TurboCat) who lassoes and electrocutes Buddy, who he believes is a stray dog, dragging him into a Batmobile-like vehicle. TurboCat then drives away into his gadget-filled secret hideout in the Glenfield Museum, where his robot butler, Sinclair, awaits him. Once there, TurboCat reveals to Buddy that humans hate animals in Glenfield, and that Officer Peck is responsible for putting stray animals in the pound, where they are never seen again. Buddy explains his situation to TurboCat, which he does not believe, and tells him that he wants to find the space capsule so that David might find him, to which TurboCat replies that he might be willing to assist Buddy if he brings him milk. Buddy finds milk in the lunch packed by David and brings it to him, but is turned down. Buddy also hands Felix the carrot he found, and it is revealed that the carrot belonged to Cassidy, a former magician's rabbit who Felix has a crush on.

Felix goes off to find Cassidy, but is stopped by Officer Peck. As Felix runs away, he is followed closely by Buddy. Eventually, Felix hops on Buddy's back, and Buddy suddenly starts to run with superhuman speed. After escaping Officer Peck, Buddy and Felix arrive at a grocery store called the Mega Store, where Cassidy's carrot came from. The two break into the store and Buddy becomes distracted by items in the store. Buddy's distractive almost got him and Felix caught by a human but by using a cute eye trick, (which Buddy tried on Felix early in the film) causes the human to leave.

== Cast ==
- Nick Frost as Buddy/StarDog
- Luke Evans as Felix/TurboCat
- Gemma Arterton as Cassidy
- Bill Nighy as Sinclair
- Ben Bailey Smith as Bullion
- Charli D'Amelio as Tinker (US, Viva Pictures)
- Rachael Louise Miller as Tinker (UK/International)
- Cory English as Peck
- Morgan Cambs as Alex
- Ben Smith as David
- Dan Russell as Victor
- Robert G. Slade as Todd

== Production ==
The film's animation was done by Sheffield-based animation studio Red Star 3D in its first animated feature film. Prior to animating StarDog, Red Star was known for making animations for theme parks.

== Release ==
StarDog and TurboCat was released theatrically in the United Kingdom on 6 December 2019. After being acquired by Viva Kids, the film was released in theaters in the US on 21 May 2020.

== Reception ==
=== Box office ===
StarDog and TurboCat grossed $48,547 in its opening weekend in the United Kingdom, eventually earning $195,844 in total. In the United States, the film grossed $80,490. Internationally, the film earned $504,953, bringing its worldwide total to $585,443.

=== Critical reception ===
Upon release, StarDog and TurboCat received mixed reviews. On review aggregation website Rotten Tomatoes, StarDog and TurboCat, the film received a 50% rating based on 10 reviews, with an average rating of 5.1/10. Film Threat's Alan Ng gave the film a rating of seven out of ten, remarking that the animation was "pretty good" and writing, "Though there's not a lot for us adults, the kids will love StarDog and TurboCat's endearing characters and goofy fun." Eddie Harrison from The List gave the film a three out of five rating, referring to the character design and backdrop as "fairly basic", and writing, "The world-building isn't as sophisticated as it should be, yet the delivery is smart enough...For Red Star 3D, it's a decent first crack at creating a fresh brand of animation." Harrison also lauded Evans's performance as Felix, writing that he was the "break-out character" and had a "laconic edge". Starburst's Jacob Walker gave the film five out of ten stars, opining that the animation was "chunky and colourful, which will keep [the viewer] invested" and that the story was "fun and sweet". However, Walker also wrote, "The movie could certainly be more focused...The jokes generally aren't funny enough to keep the majority of adults entertained."

Kevin Maher of The Times gave the film two out of five stars, calling it "tiresome stuff". Maher praised the film's animation but criticized the characters, narrative, and American setting, also noting a lack of character development. Writing for The Guardian, Cath Clarke also gave the film two out of five stars and called it "daft" but "likable enough", lauding the voice cast as "smashing" and writing, "From time to time this is reasonably entertaining...Otherwise, the action is relentless and laboured with the odd pause for a sentimental lesson or moment of personal growth. StarDog may work its slight charms on young children, but older kids will feel they've seen smarter, funnier and cleverer before."
