= If You Ask Me To =

Single by Charli D'Amelio
- Released: October 26, 2022
- Length: 3:12
- Label: Dam Fam
- Lyricists: Charli D'Amelio; Emi Secrest; Mike Schiavo
- Producer: Austin Sexton

"If You Ask Me To" (stylised in all lowercase) is the debut single by American social media personality Charli D'Amelio. It was released in October 2022. It is a ballad about teenage heartbreak. She released a lyric and music video. The song was produced by Greg Keller, who also co-wrote the track with D'Amelio, Austin Sexton, Emi Secrest and Michael Schiavo. The music video was directed by Andrew Sandler.

A remix of the song with Avedon was released on 25 August 2023.

== Charts ==
Chart performance for "If You Ask Me To"
| Chart (2022–2023) | Peak position |
|---|---|
| New Zealand Hot Singles (RMNZ) | 28 |
| US Adult Top 40 (Billboard) | 33 |
