= Facetune =

Mobile photo editing application

- Developer: Lightricks
- Release: Facetune: March 2013; Facetune2: November 2016; Facetune: August 2022
- Stable release: 2.1.3 / February 19, 2014
- Operating system: iOS 6.0 or later
- Size: 42.3 MB
- Type: Photo Editor; Video Editor
- License: Proprietary
- Website: facetuneapp.com

Facetune is a photo and video editing application used to edit, enhance, and retouch photos on a user's iOS or Android device created by Lightricks. The app is often used for portrait and selfie editing.

The app allows users to make simple edits to photos such as whitening teeth and removing blemishes.

Facetune2 was launched in November 2016. Editing tools included realistic facial editing (changing facial expressions, for instance) and the ability to re-light a subject after the photo has been taken. It also has the ability to change the background of the photo, live selfie editing, more makeup options and also add glitter. Users can share the images created with this app on a variety of social networking services. Since 2022, Facetune2 and Facetune Video, were merged into one app and reverted back to the name Facetune.

== History ==
Facetune was first released in March 2013. Before the launch of Facetune 2, it was sold as an app, cost $3.99 per download. It shifted to a subscription based model in 2016. Facetune2 is a free download but offers a subscription option that provides unlimited access to all features and content.

Facetune enables users to remove blemishes, improve complexions and perform other manipulations on their photos which could previously only be performed by Photoshop on a desktop computer.

The Facetune app is being used as a Facebook case study on user acquisition. It was also named Apple's #4 best-selling paid app in 2016 In May 2019, Facetune 2 launched on Android.

Within a year of its release, the app ranked #1 in the photo & video category in 120 countries and reached the #1 paid app in over 150 countries (as of June 2019). It was named one of App Store's Best of 2013. and was Apple's most downloaded paid app in 2017. As of 2023 it has been downloaded over 200 million times. It was awarded Google Play's best app of 2014. The Facetune App was recognized by publications such as The New York Times, USA Today, the NY Daily News, The Huffington Post and Mashable. Celebrities like Khloé Kardashian have discussed their enthusiasm for using Facetune to fine-tune their selfies. It has become popular among the lifestyle and influencer community on YouTube, with figures such as James Charles, Nikita Dragun, Tana Mongeau as well as the LGBTQ community. The app developers participated in a special panel in DragCon LA 2018 and also sponsored one of the episodes in Season 11 of RuPaul's Drag Race. Sarah Hyland admitted to using Facetune on her Instagram pictures.

== Editing features ==
=== Facetune ===
The app was released in 2013, and was unique on the marketplace.

- Retouching: users can smooth their skin to make it appear airbrushed, whiten their teeth, reshape their face, and sharpen the images around the eyes
- Lighting: users can readjust how lighting hits their face, altering the colours and shadows of the image.
- Artistic: adjust the backgrounds and add novelty filters.

=== Facetune2 ===
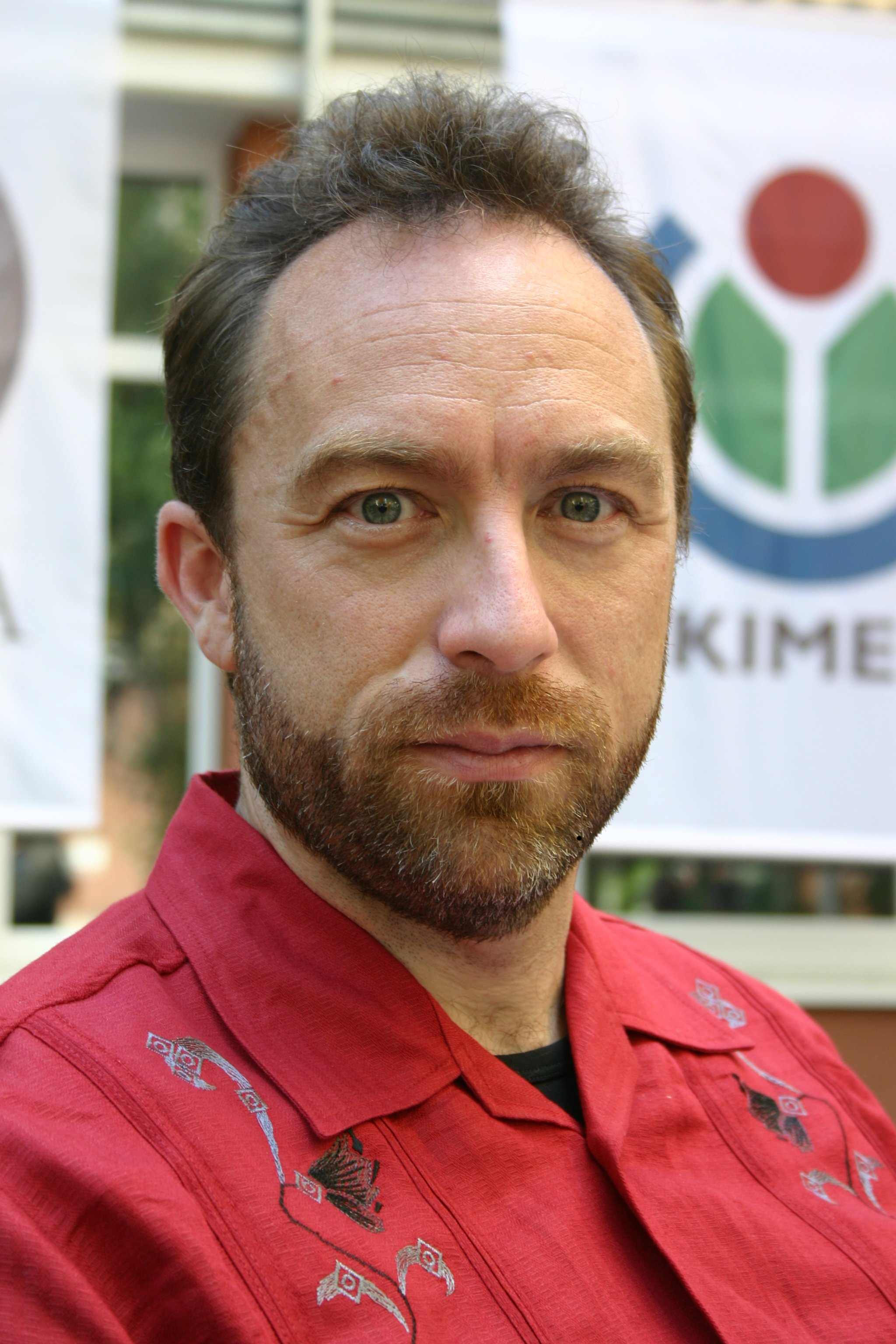
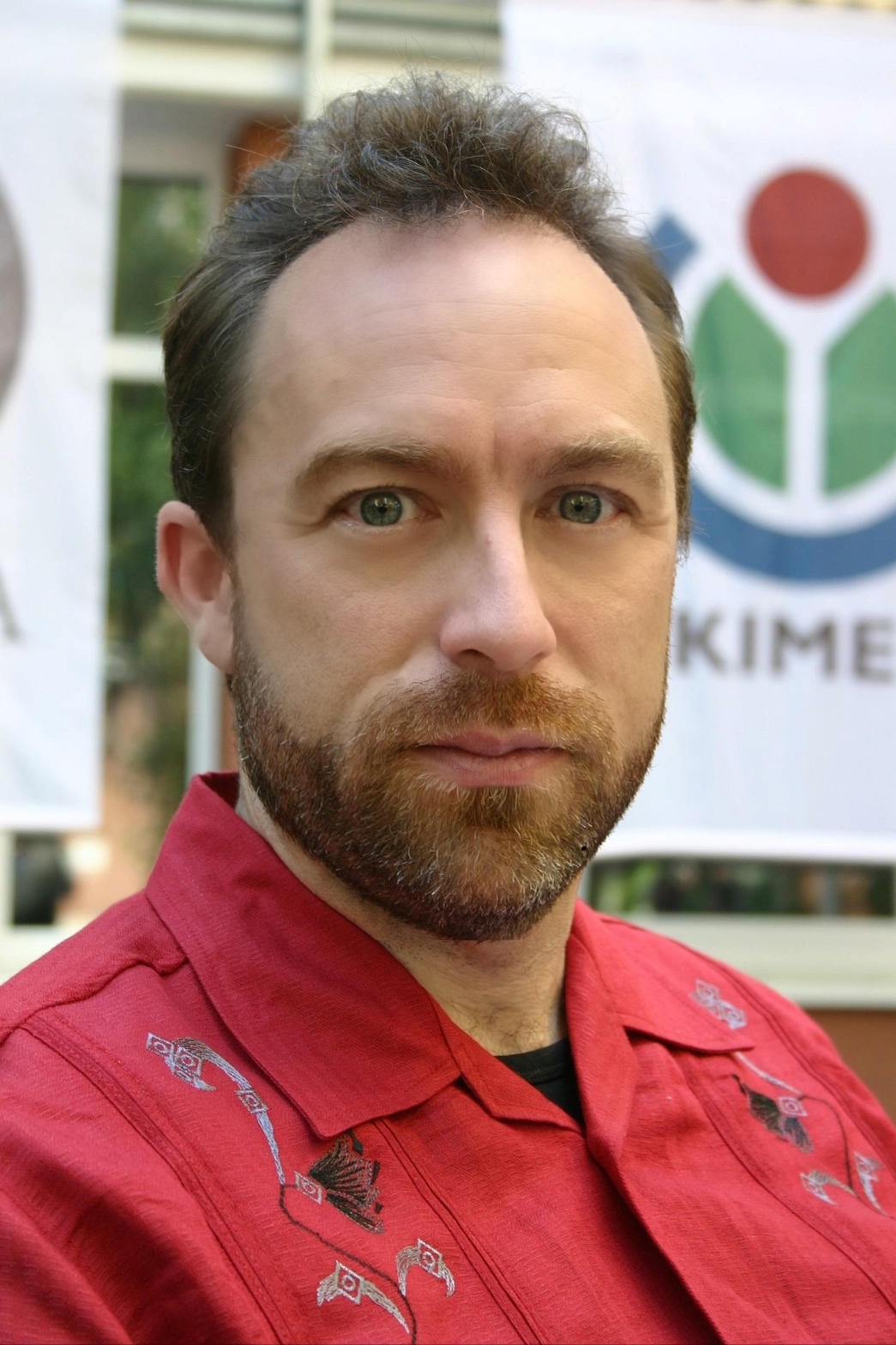
A photograph of Wikipedia co-founder Jimmy Wales before and after applying Facetune filters. The app has smoothed Wales's skin texture, and subtly altered the proportions of some of his facial features.

Released in 2016, Facetune2 included sliders for modification of the intensity of the portrait editing feature, as well as a one tap fix, which was not available in the original Facetune.

- Retouching: tools include the ability to smooth skin, swipe over blemishes and wrinkles, fix redeye, whiten teeth, add a glow, conceal dark circles, matte shiny skin, and refine facial features in terms of both size and proportion.
- Artistic: tools include adjusting, blending and replacing photo backgrounds behind the subject, and adding from a menu of dramatic to subtle mood filters. Special effects include the chromatic Prism and other effects via the LightFX tool, Glitter, and Paint to add makeup, contouring or adding Neon lighting. One can also change the background of the picture.
- Photography: a darkroom feature includes adjustment tools like Structure and Saturation. Users can also remove shadows or glare and Relight to mimic studio lighting

=== Facetune Video ===
Released in 2020, Lightricks offered an app called Facetune Video allowing users to create the same know Facetune effects for Videos.

=== Facetune ===
In 2022, Lightricks combined Facetune2 and Facetune video, and renamed the app back to Facetune, and added new features in addition to already popular tools:

- Makeup tool, allowing users to create full makeup looks
- AI based Enhance tool, for automatically retouching photos
- Remove object tool, allowing users to remove objects and unwanted elements from photos
- Hairstyles tool, allowing users to virtually change their hairstyle, color, and volume
- Beard tool, which adds or removes facial hair and adjusts beard style
- Outfit tool, enabling outfit changes or clothing enhancements using generative AI
- Background tool, which automatically replaces or generates photo backgrounds

== Development ==
Facetune was created by Lightricks, an Israel-based startup company established by five entrepreneurs. Lightricks builds photo and video editing applications for smartphones, which are focused on content creation. The company is based in the Hebrew University Gav Yam Complex in Givat Ram, Jerusalem, with offices in New York, Chicago and London. Lightricks is the developer of LTEngine, an image processing engine designed for mobile platforms, which was used in Facetune.

== Criticism ==
Selfie-enhancing and other photo editing apps have been criticized for encouraging users to catfish or pretend to be someone else on the internet, especially on social networking platforms.

This motivation to seek "perfection" is also seen as undermining self and body confidence, particularly in younger users. The increased use of body and facial reshaping applications such as Snapchat and Facetune has been identified as a potential cause of body dysmorphia.

A 2020 study reveals the impacts of Facetune and how it is instilling and encouraging people's desires to undergo cosmetic surgery. Recently, a phenomenon referred to as "Snapchat dysmorphia" has been used to describe people who request surgery to look like the edited version of themselves as they appear through Snapchat Filters.

More recently, some editing apps have introduced features focused on artistic and stylistic editing rather than traditional beauty standards, reflecting a broader industry shift toward creative expression and transparency.

=== Ethical concerns ===
Image editing, especially with Facetune, has created debates regarding the ethical concerns.

Editing can be used unethically to manipulate people’s perceptions and perpetuate insecurity. Some people or industries may exploit editing to create unattainable ideals, particularly in fashion and beauty industries, where heavily edited images set unrealistic standards for people to follow.

== See also ==
- Adobe Photoshop
- Image editing
- List of photo and video apps
- Snapseed
