= LTX Studio =

Artificial intelligence video generation product

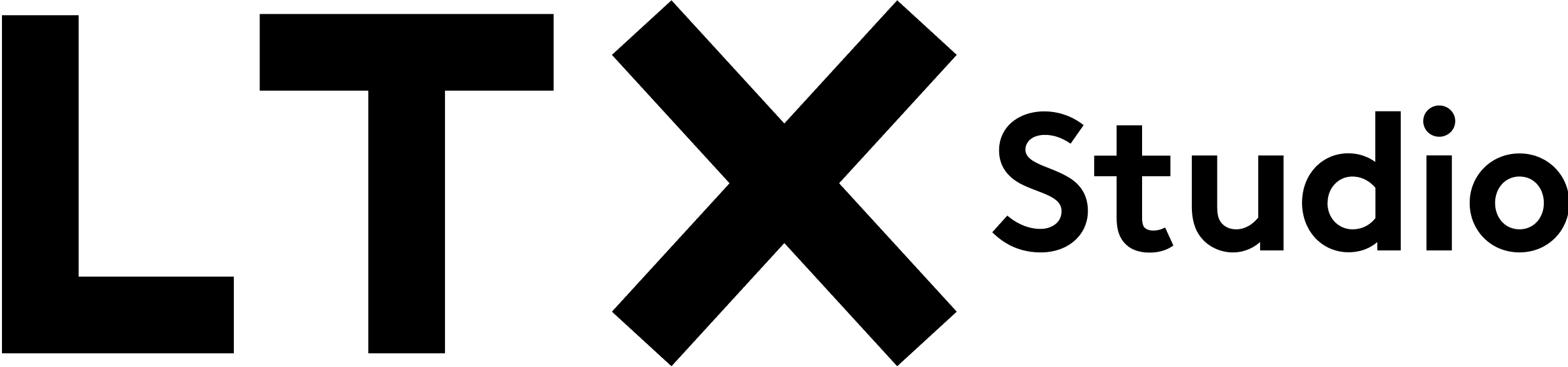
- Developer: Lightricks
- Release: 28 February 2024
- Engine: Veo 3, LTX-2, Nano Banana, Flux.2
- Type: Video generation tool
- Website: ltx.studio

LTX Studio is an artificial intelligence (AI) video-generation platform launched in February 2024 by Israeli tech company Lightricks. LTX Studio is part of the LTX ecosystem, developed by Lightricks, that includes an open-source model (LTX-2) and commercial API access. The product lets users turn text prompts or scripts into characters, scenes, storyboards, and video sequences with integrated editing controls such as framing and camera direction. LTX Studio entered public availability later in 2024 after a beta period.

== History ==
LTX Studio was announced on 28 February 2024. Initial media coverage described it as an AI tool designed to generate scripts, storyboards, and video shots from user prompts.

In November 2024, Lightricks introduced LTX Video (LTXV), its first open-source video generation model. The company stated that the model could produce short clips in near-real-time and would serve as the underlying technology for LTX Studio. In May 2025, Lightricks released an open-source model, LTXV-13B, and announced its integration into the company's products, including LTX Studio. In July 2025, Lightricks announced an autoregressive update that allowed for the generation of continuous video clips of up to approximately 60 seconds. Also in 2025, Lightricks announced the integration of Google DeepMind’s Veo 3 model into LTX Studio, adding capabilities for video generation with AI-generated audio, such as lip sync and ambient sound.

In October 2025, Lightricks introduced LTX-2, its newest version of their open-source video generation model. This was integrated into the LTX Studio platform for users as part of the offered video generation models.

== Reception ==
Reviews of the software have noted its storyboard-based authoring, control over shot composition and camera angles, and project-level tools for organizing sequences. Subsequent reports noted the product's near-real-time generation speed as a distinguishing feature among open-source video models.
