= Poorhouse Rock =

- The Simpsons episode
- Bart (sitting) meets the janitor, voiced by Hugh Jackman. Despite turning down a cameo on the series years prior, Jackman happily accepted his role in "Poorhouse Rock", and enjoyed the singing he had to do for it.
- Episode no.: Season 33; Episode 22
- Directed by: Jennifer Moeller
- Written by: Tim Long
- Production code: UABF14
- Original air date: May 22, 2022
- Running time: 23 minutes

Guest appearances
- Hugh Jackman as the janitor; Megan Mullally as Sarah Wiggum; Robert Reich as himself

Episode features
- Couch gag: Older versions of the kids from Springfield Elementary have a party in the house. Homer and Marge soon arrive home, and everyone hides in scattered places.

Episode chronology
← Previous "Meat Is Murder"	Next → "Habeas Tortoise"
- The Simpsons season 33

"Poorhouse Rock" is the twenty-second and final episode of the thirty-third season of the American animated television series The Simpsons. The 728th episode overall, it originally aired in the United States on the Fox Network on May 22, 2022. The episode was directed by Jennifer Moeller and written by Tim Long.

The series follows the dysfunctional Simpson family, consisting of patriarch Homer (Dan Castellaneta), matriarch Marge (Julie Kavner), son Bart (Nancy Cartwright), oldest daughter Lisa (Yeardley Smith), and youngest Maggie, as they live out their misadventures in the town of Springfield. In the episode, Bart grows impressed with Homer's work, and wishes to grow up to be like him, but a janitor (Hugh Jackman) at the power plant, along with the rest of Springfield, warns him through a musical number that political and economic factors will prevent Bart from doing so.

The episode was conceived after an article was published in The Atlantic about how the lifestyle the Simpson family has been able to maintain was no longer achievable for future generations, inspiring Long to write a musical episode explaining the situation. Jackman and previous United States Secretary of Labor Robert Reich guest starred in the episode, with the former's role coming after he previously declined an appearance on the show years prior. The episode explores themes of money, progressive politics, and the decline of the middle class. Upon release, the episode received generally positive reviews from critics.

== Plot ==
During a Saturday night hang out with her friends, Simpson family matriarch Marge sends her husband Homer, son Bart, daughter Lisa, and youngest Maggie away so she can have a calm night of drinking with her friends while watching the period piece television series Tunnelton. The next morning, a severely hungover Marge insists that Homer should drive the kids to church in her place. In Sunday school, Bart shows his class a supercut of Homer acting foolish and angry, and, seeing it, Homer is humiliated and starts to fear that Bart does not respect him. After Marge asserts that she felt proud of her father when he took her to his job one day, Homer takes Bart to the nuclear power plant where he works; Bart is quickly won over by the privileges and high pay that Homer earns without doing much work.

Bart declares that he wants to be a nuclear safety inspector like his father, but, when he comes to the plant the next day, a janitor tells Bart that Homer's job does not exist for the current or any upcoming generation. Through song, the janitor explains the build-up and eventual decline of the middle class, and Lisa raps about how higher standards in education and rising cost of student loans will stop Bart from taking over Homer's position or be able to pay his bills while leaving money for his wants.

Bart then argues that he can make a living through the internet, but the janitor finds it unlikely. Various elderly residents of Springfield sing about the increasingly poor political candidates they are forced to vote for, doing so only because of fearmongering on social media. Bart gives up and accepts he has no future, but the janitor follows him to his treehouse and implores him to burn the system and reform it, which Bart takes literally by starting a fire. As the treehouse goes up in flames, Bart fearfully admits that he does want to live to see the future, and he is subsequently rescued by several firemen, who tell him about their job benefits and security. Bart then realizes that his future is in firefighting, as there will always be fires in the world for him to put out.

== Production ==
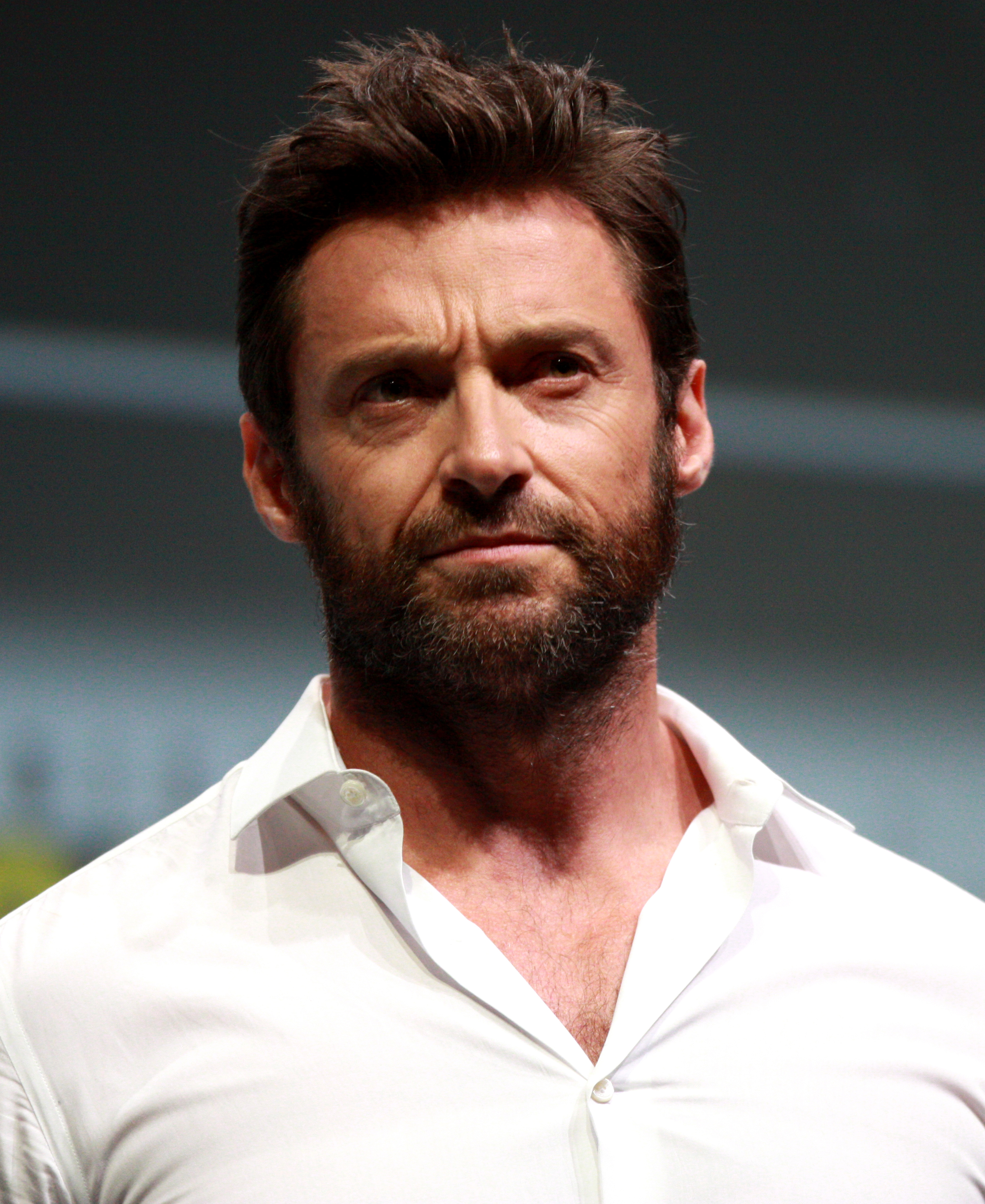
Hugh Jackman (left; pictured 2013) and Robert Reich (right; pictured 2026) made guest appearances in the episode's musical number.

"Poorhouse Rock" was directed by Jennifer Moeller and written by Tim Long. Hugh Jackman makes a guest appearance in the episode as the janitor who sings to Bart, and former United States Secretary of Labor Robert Reich appears in the musical number as well. Jackman was offered a role on the series years prior for an Australia-themed episode, along with Liam and Chris Hemsworth, but Jackman turned it down due to scheduling issues, despite wanting to do it. When they asked him to make an appearance in "Poorhouse Rock", he said yes, loving his role and the song he had to perform. Megan Mullally also appeared in the episode, playing Sarah Wiggum, one of the friends Marge invited over to watch television with. Reich and Jackman recorded their lines for the episode in November 2021, and, according to Long, Jackman at one point exclaimed "I love singing" while recording his lines. The episode was the last of which Chris Ledesma collaborated as music editor, having edited for The Simpsons for several decades. The show Marge watches, Tunnelton, is a parody of the American television series Bridgerton. The fictional series has also been compared to other historical dramas, particularly Downton Abbey.

The idea for the episode came from Long, who wanted to do an episode based around the middle class and how it has changed. Showrunner Matt Selman noted that the idea of the Simpson family having an unrealistic lifestyle in the current economy had been echoed by many, including an article from The Atlantic. Seeing this article, Long and the other writers become fascinated with the idea that the life Homer—and by extension the entire Simpson family—has is no longer achievable, despite initially dismissing the idea, finding it inane to think such a way about an animated series. When the concept grew on him, Long started to brainstorm it. After thinking about the pitch for a few days, it was decided that the episode should contain a musical number. Initially, the song was supposed to go for one single act, but the crew was pushed to make it even longer, and not worry about how they would have to cut to commercial halfway through the number. According to Selman, the table read for the song was "easy", as they all created mock up versions of it and played them together to create a rhythm. A cut montage from the episode would have included Homer "hate-spend[ing]" an entire paycheck in a day to show Bart the value of money, including going to an amusement park, eating ice cream, and getting his car detailed and "undetailed". Executive producer James L. Brooks felt the idea was too "crazy", and so it was turned into Bart simply seeing how much Homer makes while doing such little work, and assuming he will have a job as simple as Homer's in the future. The episode's couch gag, depicting the adolescent characters of the series as teenagers, was designed by Spike R. Monster, a fan artist of The Simpsons. The sequence shares the same character designs with his Simpsons-themed webcomic, Those Springfield Kids, which follows aged up versions of the characters.

== Themes ==
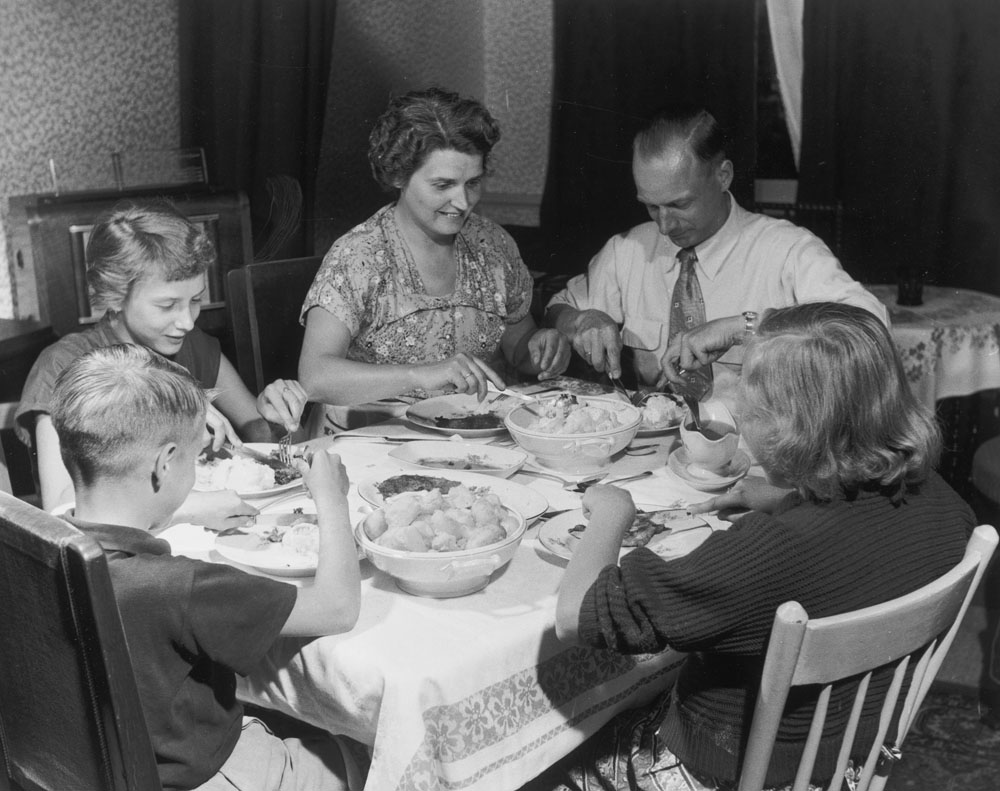
The episode satirizes the series itself, and how the idealistic middle class lifestyle the family has is no longer realistic.

Through its lampooning of the current job market and moral of "There's no future for you", the episode took a "punk" approach to storytelling that proved unusual for the series, according to Den of Geek writer Tony Sokol. He also felt it marked a shift for the series, which started out by equally offending all sides, and now goes for "progressive parody". "Poorhouse Rock" serves as a commentary on the series itself, and how it has been running for so long that the once mediocre life the Simpson family has is now almost inaccessible to most people, largely in part to the "modern economic context". Long felt that the series had already ambiguously handled the topic of money and how the family handles it before, specifically in an episode where Homer is given one trillion dollars and tries to use it in a vending machine, establishing that money is not an important constant for the series or Homer.

Patrick Carroll, writing a counterargument to the episode for the Foundation for Economic Education, viewed the episode as inaccurate with its depiction of the American working class and the numbers it presented that Carroll felt were false. He asserted that the episode was still focusing on the correct issue with its handling of the subject, but felt the musical number leaving out how the government affects the economy was "egregious", and speculated that it could have been purposely avoided.

On top of its commentary on the economy and the "death" of the middle class, "Poorhouse Rock" criticizes the conservative network Fox News, particularly political commentator Tucker Carlson, with a caricature of Carlson in the episode announcing, "Putin for president, next on Fox News" to viewers. Also mocked is Mark Zuckerberg, seen using his social media platform Facebook to spearhead the "death of democracy" and feed false information to the elderly. Matt Darling of the Niskanen Center considered the episode a testament to how many people have grown nostalgic for times when families "thrived on a single income", specifically citing Robert Reich's part in the episode and how, later when promoting the episode, he claimed that the idea of achieving a life like the Simpson family is merely fantastical.

== Release and reception ==
"Poorhouse Rock" first aired on the Fox Network at 8:00 p.m. EST on May 22, 2022. In the United States, the episode was watched by a total of 0.93 million viewers during its original broadcast, making it the second most-watched show on the channel that night. It garnered a 0.28% share among adults between the ages of 18 and 49, meaning that it was seen by 0.28% of all households in that demographic. It marked a decrease in viewership from the previous episode, "Meat Is Murder", which had earned a 0.31% rating and drew in 1.00 million viewers.

Sokol gave the episode 4 out of 5 stars in his review, finding the episode reflective of the series returning to its original "anti-establishment roots". He considered the episode to be better than the season premiere, "The Star of the Backstage", another musical episode, finding "Poorhouse Rock" to be a much more provoking, well-written piece all around, but found the song in the beginning of the episode—where the family sings a hymn in church about praising God—to be more memorable than the main musical number. In 2023, Eleanor Burnard of Collider ranked the episode's couch gag as the second best of the whole series to be done by a guest animator, praising the series for giving a fan the opportunity to show off their talents. ScreenRant writer Cathal Gunning praised the episode's musical sequence as "authentically sharp” for its theming around the decline of the middle class, finding it to be one of the best and most noteworthy aspects of the entire season.
