= Marge the Meanie =

- The Simpsons episode
- Episode no.: Season 33; Episode 20
- Directed by: Timothy Bailey
- Written by: Megan Amram
- Production code: UABF15
- Original air date: May 8, 2022

Episode features
- Chalkboard gag: "I will not violate the laws of entropy" is seen during the reversed opening sequence in the end credits.
- Couch gag: The heads of the family are sculptured on Mount Rushmore, Homer starts picking his nose, a tree branch. Marge warns him not to pick it, but he keeps picking it until his head falls off.

Episode chronology
← Previous "Girls Just Shauna Have Fun"	Next → "Meat Is Murder"
- The Simpsons season 33

"Marge the Meanie" is the twentieth episode of the thirty-third season of the American animated television series The Simpsons, and the 726th episode overall. It aired in the United States on Fox on May 8, 2022. The episode was directed by Timothy Bailey and written by Megan Amram.

In this episode, Bart learns that Marge used to prank people, so she reluctantly does pranks with Bart to bond with him while Lisa and Homer bond over their love of food. The episode received positive reviews.

The episode is dedicated in memory of Ian Wilcox, who died eight days before it aired.

== Plot ==
When the Simpsons attend a shuffleboard game that the Springfield Retirement Home is playing, Marge is badmouthed in public by her former principal Ms. York. She reveals to her family that she was secretly a prankster in her middle school years. Marge, Patty and Selma explain that when Marge complained about being bullied by other girls to York and was dismissed, she accidentally dropped a can from her tray, which York tripped on, causing her to fall into a garbage can. The incident instantly made Marge popular amongst the girls, and encouraged her to carry out further pranks against York. Bart and Marge both bond over this newly unveiled connection between them, and Bart spurs Marge on to commit various harmless but embarrassing pranks on people including Comic Book Guy and Helen Lovejoy. Though Marge is amused by the pranks, she also feels remorse for committing them and is conflicted due to her newfound bond with Bart.

When Marge pulls a prank on Mr. Burns that goes too far and causes him serious injury, she divulges her conflicts to her court-mandated therapist, who suggests that Marge find York and make peace with her in order to resolve her guilt. When Marge pledges to give up her pranking, Bart protests, saying he does not know who he is without her pranking as an influence, so she promises to pull one last prank on York. Marge tracks down York and apologizes to her with a bouquet of flowers, but the bouquet sprays blue paint planted by Marge and Bart onto York's face. To both Marge and Bart's horror, York collapses from an apparent fatal heart attack from the prank, and Chief Wiggum threatens to send Bart to juvenile detention and Marge to prison. As a frightened and distraught Bart then pledges to never prank again, York stands up alive and well, scaring him and revealing that she had teamed up with Marge for a prank on Bart to teach him the dangers of pranking. At home, Bart and Marge affirm their love and respect for one another, agree never to prank again and affectionately embrace. Bart tapes a "The End" sign on Marge's back, indicating that he has truly reformed from pranking; but Marge tapes a sign on Bart "It never ends.", indicating that she may prank again in the future.

Feeling left out by Bart and Marge's bond, Homer seeks to find some kind of common ground with Lisa, and discovers they both share a love for food. Though Homer is impressed by Lisa's jackfruit substitute for pork, he is unable to fully enjoy her vegan cooking or her choices of vegan restaurants. He eventually confesses to Lisa his dislike for veganism when a vegan stew she is making swells his tongue, only for Lisa to also swell her tongue tasting it. At the hospital, Homer and Lisa learn that they both share various common allergies. When Homer apologizes to Lisa for passing his allergies down to her, Lisa assures him that he shares his kind heart with her.

During the end credits, Marge writes a bunch of letters apologizing to all the people she pranked. A reversed version of the title sequence follows after.

== Production ==
The episode is dedicated in memory of Ian Wilcox, who was a lead background layout artist and background designer on the show. He previously worked on the television series King of the Hill and Family Guy.

== Reception ==
=== Viewing figures ===
The episode scored a 0.26 ratings with 0.85 million viewers, which was the third most watched show on Fox that night.

=== Critical response ===
Tony Sokol of Den of Geek gave the episode a 4.5 out of 5 stars stating, "'Marge the Meanie' is something to bring home to mother and still feel guilty about, with a wealth of one-liners to spare. Marge's final apologies pull the entire fiasco together perfectly. It makes the subtle mockery of false apologies ring very true."

Marcus Gibson of Bubbleblabber gave the episode an 7/10 stating, "Overall, 'Marge the Meanie' has The Simpsons celebrating Mother's Day with a slew of pranks and a cup of chuckles. The result is an enjoyably amusing mischievous act that causes more laughs than harm, with the highlights being the Mount Rushmore couch gag and a nod to James Cameron's long-awaited Avatar sequel. While its narrative about pranking isn't entirely new, it compensates with a mildly sweet depiction of Bart's unexpected bond with Marge due to their common interest. I would even say it's a suitable Mother's Day gift to the moms who still enjoy the long-running series."
