= Vera Bradley =

American luggage and handbag design company

Vera Bradley, Inc.
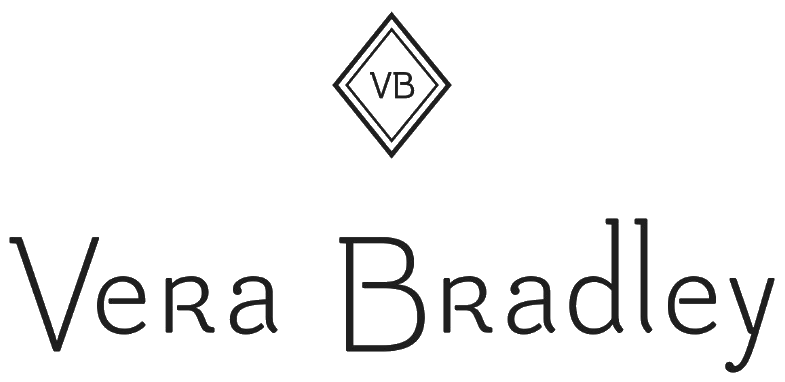
- Trade name: Vera Bradley
- Type: Public
- Traded as: Nasdaq: VRA; Russell 2000 component
- Founded: 1982; 44 years ago
- Founder: Barbara Bradley Baekgaard and Patricia Miller
- Headquarters: Roanoke, Indiana, U.S.
- Number of locations: 126 Retail Stores (February 2025)
- Key people: Ian Bickley (Chairman and CEO); Martin Layding (CFO and COO); Mark Dely (CAO); Alison Hiatt (CMO) Melinda Paraie (CBO) Chief Brand Officer
- Products: handbags, luggage, fashion accessories
- Revenue: US$371,967,000 (2025)
- Number of employees: Approximately 1,630 (February 2025)
- Website: www.verabradley.com

Vera Bradley Sales, LLC (d.b.a. Vera Bradley) is an American travel gear design company, founded by Barbara Bradley Baekgaard and Patricia R. Miller in 1982. As of 2026, its home office is in Roanoke, Indiana. The company was named after Baekgaard's mother. Its original luxury cotton bag product lines have expanded to include fashion and home accessories, office supplies, and patterned gifts. Many items have distinctive florals, paisleys, or geometric prints with complementary linings, as well as elongated diamond quilting. The patterns were originally inspired by French Provençal country fabrics and have limited seasonal releases each year. In March 2026, the company named Ian Bickley Chairman and CEO.

== Company Creation and Growth ==
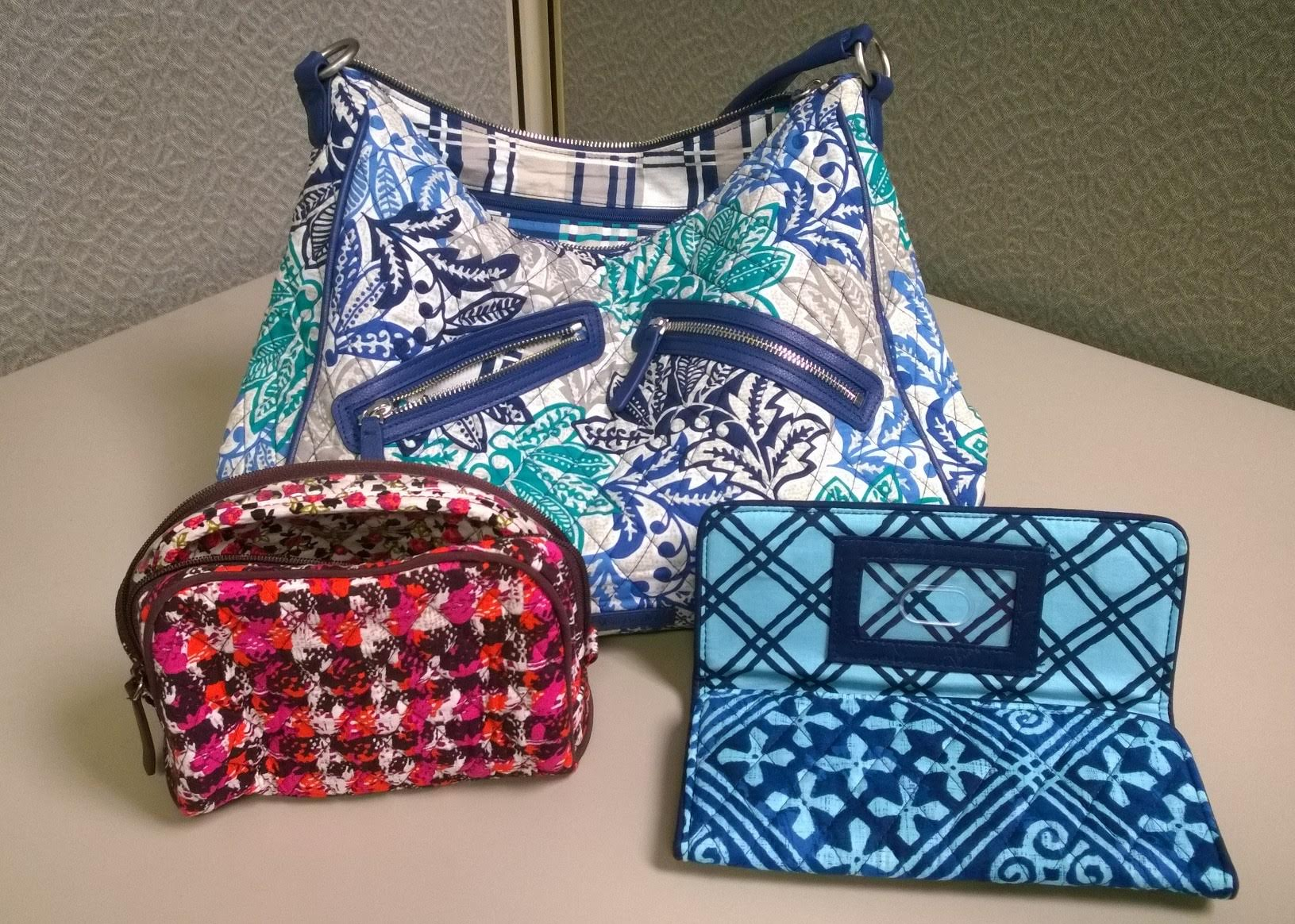
A selection of open Vera Bradley products with traditional contrasting cotton fabrics and distinctive diamond stitching

=== Company Creation ===
The founders, Baekgaard and Miller, met in 1975 in Fort Wayne. Baekgaard was redecorating her home by hanging wallpaper when Miller, who was new to the area, came over to her house and introduced herself. Baekgaard asked for help hanging the wallpaper and this experience developed into a wallpapering company they created, called Up Your Wall.

The two were in an airport while traveling back from Florida for a spring trunk show, the pair noticed the bland, masculine carry-on bags that many travelers were using. Baekgaard and Miller thought that women may want the option to use something brighter and more feminine. Once back in Indiana, they borrowed $500 from their husbands, bought some fabrics inspired by the Pierre Deux French Provençal look popular at the time, and had a seamstress friend develop prototype bags. They disassociated the bags from the wallpaper they sold in order to find out what the demand would be if the customers were not aware the bags were produced by them. The two named the bags "Vera Bradley" after Baekgaard's mother. The bags sold well, and family members ran the business out of Baekgaard's basement. Family involvement was at the forefront of "Vera Bradley" with the first logo created by Baekgaard's teenage daughter, and mother Vera became a sales representative in Florida.

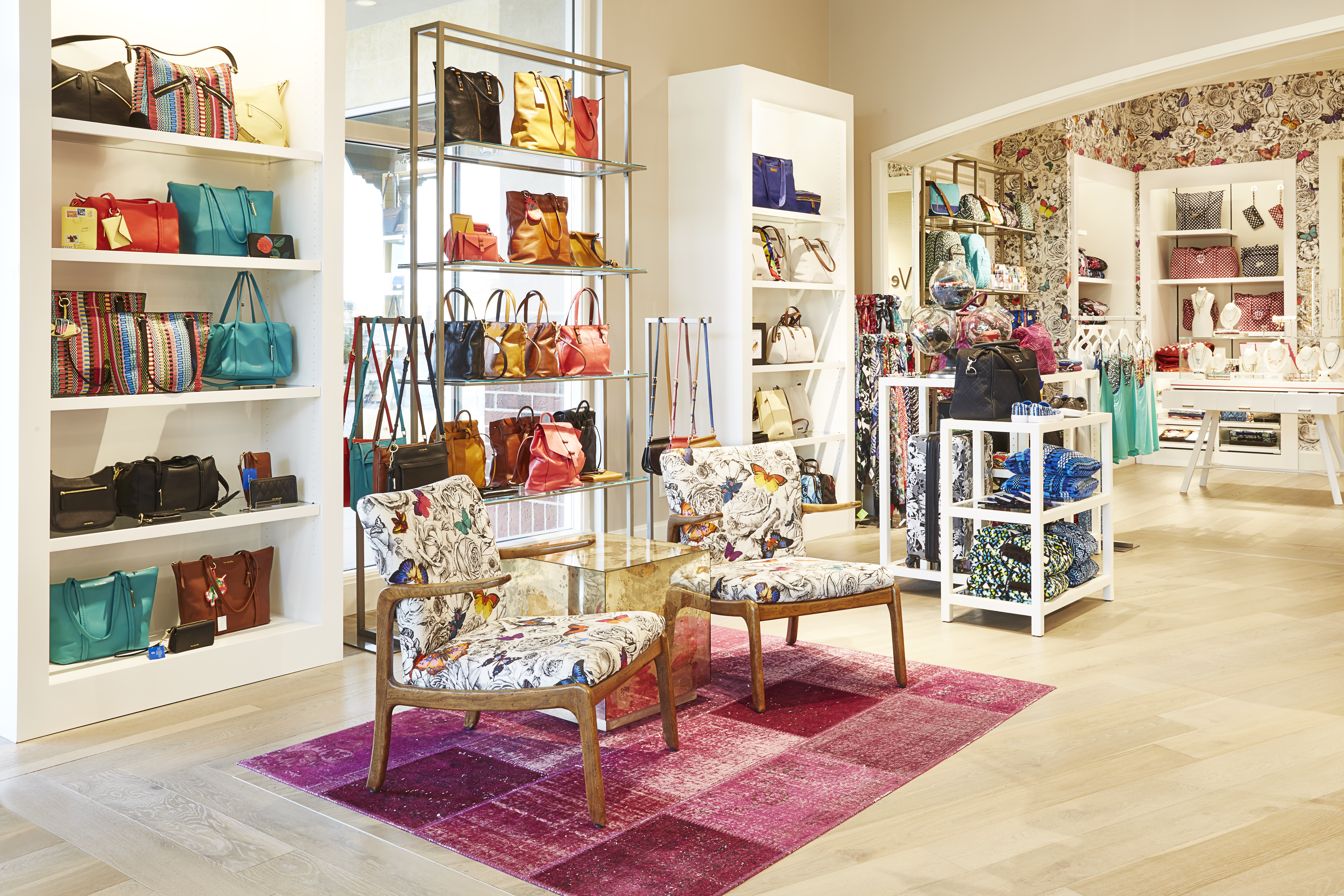
Vera Bradley store interior, Jefferson Pointe in Ft. Wayne, IN

Vera Bradley Designs was incorporated on November 15, 1982.

=== Retail ===
The majority of bags were initially sold through small shops as well as Marshall Field's. The business did not have issues selling the bags, but did encounter difficulty keeping up with the demand. They hired local seamstresses as well as provided a loan for the creation of Phoenix Sewing, a company dedicated to making Vera Bradley products. Phoenix Sewing was under contract to not produce other products unless their board agreed to do so, where Baekgaard and Miller were board members. Eventually several sewing companies formed and expanded in the area to produce the products.

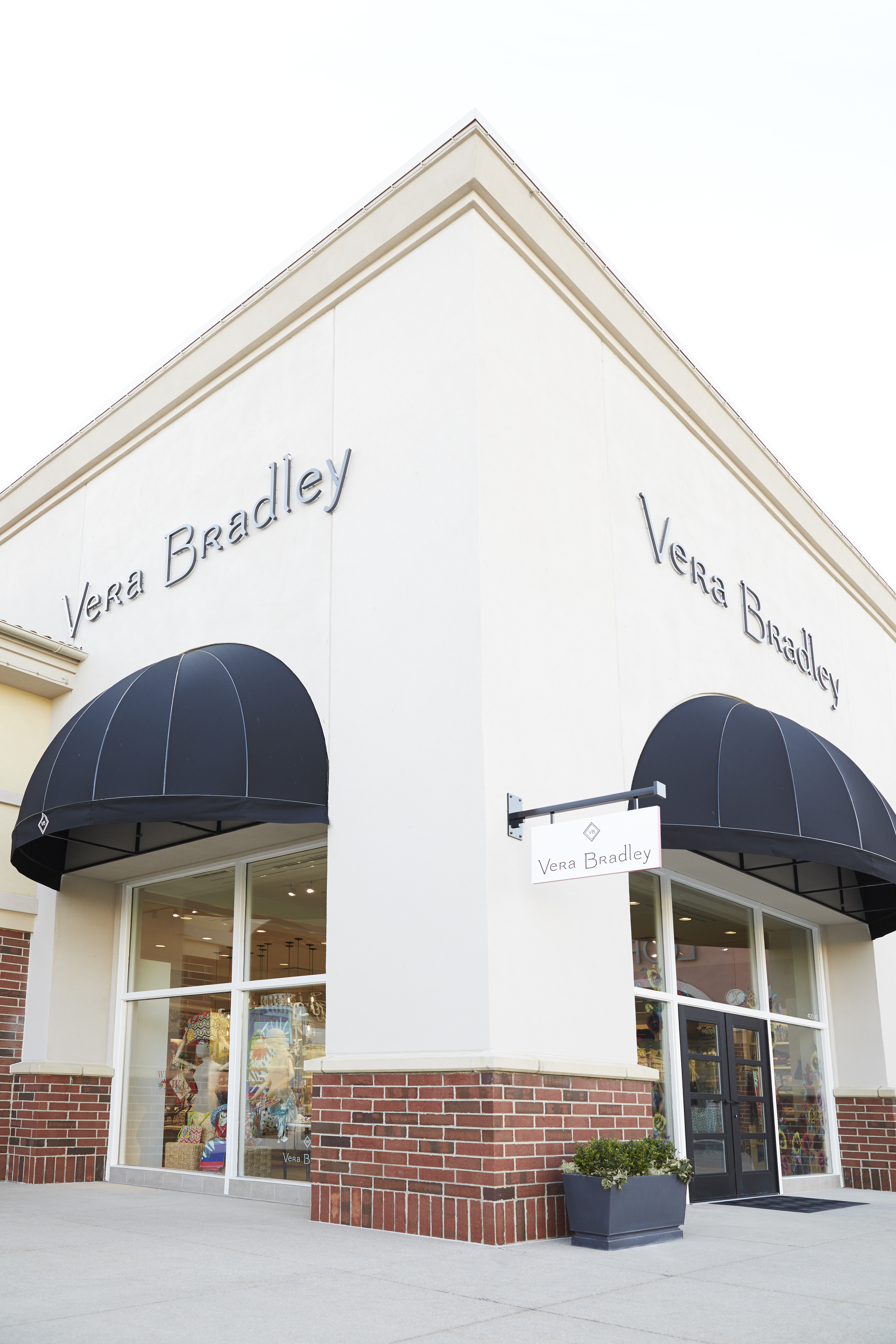
Vera Bradley store exterior

Continued growth was initiated when the company started selling online in 2004. Small shop owners who had helped the company gain its market early on were disgruntled, but the Vera Bradley owners claimed the wider exposure would be able to drive more people to the small shops, when they might have overlooked them previously.

The annual Spring Outlet Sale in Fort Wayne proved to be so popular that in 2005, the company sold out of products and the next year, a per-person spending cap was initiated.

=== Rebranding ===
In an attempt to appeal to millennial buyers, who perceived the goods as not pertinent to their lifestyles, the brand was refreshed. The logo was updated, goods made of microfiber and leather were introduced, technical accessories such as bags with grommets and pockets for charging electrical devices and computer and tablet bags were made.

=== Advertising and Expansion ===
A news story on Good Morning America generated more interest in the products when it featured an interview with college students about various campus trends, and one of the sorority girls had a Vera Bradley bag.

Advertising was done on Hulu, Pandora Radio, and Spotify as well as in Glamour and InStyle magazines. Licensing deals were made with other companies to use Vera Bradley designs on their goods. The initial "#itsgoodtobeagirl" campaign was perceived as patronizing and old-fashioned, but was quickly amended to portray women in active, unusual jobs and promoted the company's image as being socially conscious.

In 2019, the company purchased a 75% stakeholder share in Creative Genius, parent company of Pura Vida Bracelets, a bracelet company based in La Jolla, California. They have the option to purchase the remainder of the company in 2024.

=== Corporate ===
In March 2026, the company named Ian Bickley as the company's new CEO and Chairman. Bickely, who has been with the company for over 24 years, previously served as Executive Chairman.

== Overseas Production Expansion ==
Circa 2007, the company started to employ overseas manufacturing to lower costs and keep up with demand. As a result, several US-based sewing companies, including Superior Sample, Phoenix Sewing, and one of their oldest partners, KAM Manufacturing, had to reduce their workforce or close their facilities altogether. In 2008, customers started to aggressively inquire about where their products were being made, after making online complaints that the labeling said China instead of the United States. When they were directed to the company's website, it stated that most products were manufactured within 90 minutes from the Fort Wayne area, and a company representative said that production fluctuates at locations according to consumer demand.

The company has expressed concern regarding potential difficulty in dealing with tariffs the Trump administration has considered on goods imported from China. In a 2018 letter to United States Trade Representative Robert Lighthizer, Steve Bohman, the Vice President of Global Sourcing for Vera Bradley, stated that "Between 2014 and our expectations for 2019, we will have reduced our China-based production from approximately 95% to under 50%, a r." but "In approximately 21% of our categories, there is not a viable alternative supply outside of China." The letter requested the removal of the category of import tariffs that would affect their products. A retail analyst stated that if the tariffs remained, it would provide an incentive to move production of the goods to yet another country instead of bringing production back into the US, due to a lack of sewing companies based in the US. The company had already started moving production from China to Myanmar, Cambodia and Vietnam, but due to the tariff issue, sped up the move to the other manufacturing locations.

== Merchandise ==
The most popular piece of Vera Bradley merchandise is the Vera Bradley Original Tote Bag. Other popular styles include the Vera Bradley Original Zip Hipster, Foxbury Crossbody, Lorman Sling Backpack, Large Bancroft Backpack, Small Banbury Backpack, Large Original Duffel Bag, Lunch Cooler, and various styles of pouch sets. Vera Bradley offers bright colors, patterns, solid colors, quilted items, and the paisleys that have been a consistent pattern with Vera Bradley since the company's creation.

== Vera Bradley Foundation for Breast Cancer ==
Mary Sloan, longtime friend to Baekgaard and Miller and one of the company's first sales representatives, died in the early 1990s from breast cancer; Sloan's mother and grandmother died from the disease as well. In 1993, Baekgaard and Miller initiated contributions to assist in funding research for a cure for breast cancer with a portion of Vera Bradley's profits. The Vera Bradley Foundation for Breast Cancer was created in 1998 and sponsors the annual Vera Bradley Foundation for Breast Cancer Classic, which is a multiple-day fundraising event with yoga, golf, and pickleball (which replaced tennis in 2019), concluding with a dinner. As of 2015, it was the largest amateur women's golf and tennis charity tournament in the country. The public and corporate sponsors are invited to volunteer and donate. The company also produces special Breast Cancer Awareness fabric patterns that have the color pink as a main component. Funds collected from the activities and donations go to the Vera Bradley Foundation Center for Breast Cancer Research at the Indiana University School of Medicine in Indianapolis, Indiana. Posts from the cancer researchers and Vera Bradley on Facebook, Instagram and the company's blog were used to help recruit patients for clinical trials. Research information is published on the website of the Melvin and Bren Simon Cancer Center at Indiana University for scientists to be able to collaborate toward a cure.

== Corporate Restructuring and Retail Transition (2025–2026). ==
In January 2025, Vera Bradley implemented a restructuring strategy named Project Sunshine, intended to reduce annual operational costs by approximately $20 million. As part of this initiative, the company reduced its full-line retail store count by over 43 percent between 2023 and 2026, which included closing 12 full-line locations and one outlet store during fiscal year 2026. To transition away from underperforming traditional shopping malls, the company increased its factory outlet storefronts to 86 locations, expanded its e-commerce infrastructure, and established a wholesale distribution partnership with Nordstrom. The turnaround plan also involved a corporate focus on the company's traditional product lines, specifically its signature quilted cotton patterned bags and travel accessories.
