= Michael S. Farbman =

Russian Civil War correspondent and non-fiction book writer

Michael S. Farbman (also known as Grisha; c. 1880 – 27 May 1933) was a Russian journalist, writer and publisher of books. He was London correspondent for the Russian Bourse Gazette in the early part of the First World War and returned to Russia in April 1917 to cover the aftermath of the February Revolution for the Manchester Guardian, becoming the first correspondent with connections to the British Press to cover it from Russia. Farbman was in New York in 1918 as correspondent for Maxim Gorky's Novaya Zhizn pro-Menshevik newspaper, and wrote to oppose the Allied intervention in the Russian Civil War. Returning to Russia, he was one of the first correspondents with connections to the British Press to cover the early stages of the Russian Civil War. He published a number of books on post-revolution Russia and his study on the first five-year plan was particularly popular in the United States. Farbman was manager of the Europa book publishing firm and established the Europa Annual, intended to bring coverage of political and economic matters to the masses.

== Biography ==
Michael S. Farbman was born in Russia around 1880, he was also known as "Grisha". He studied at the Ludwig-Maximilians-Universität München and the University of Zurich. In the years leading up to the First World War, he worked as a book publisher in Russia, printing a number of classic works of literature from across the world. Farbman travelled to London in 1915 to work as a correspondent for the Bourse Gazette of Petrograd. He was still in London for the newspaper during the 1917 February Revolution which overthrew the Russia tsar and brought about the Russian Provisional Government. Farbman wrote in the British press to urge the public to support the revolution, which he characterised as largely moderate, and to claim that the events had strengthened Russia as an ally in the First World War.

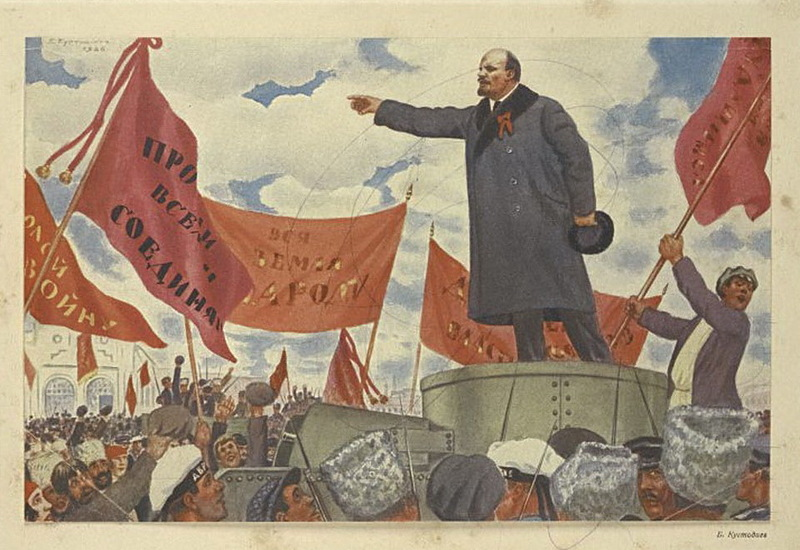
Lenin speaking upon his arrival in Petrograd

Farbman returned to Petrograd in April 1917 as a correspondent for the Manchester Guardian. Farbman reached the city at around the same time as Bolshevik leader Vladimir Lenin. He reported on the panic in the city caused by Lenin's arrival. Farbman was the first journalist with connections to the British press to report on this stage of the revolution. He returned to London in July but was back in Russia for the winter of 1917–1918, a key period in the Russian Civil War that followed the October Revolution that brought the Bolsheviks to power. His reports were noted by The Observer as "one of the outstanding successes of the time in special correspondence".

Later in 1918, Farbman became the New York correspondent for Maxim Gorky's Novaya Zhizn pro-Menshevik newspaper. He wrote articles in newspapers to oppose the proposed Allied intervention in the Russian Civil War. His book Russia and the Struggle for Peace was published in 1918. A reviewer for the Evening News said "I would make Michael S. Farbman's Russia and the Struggle for Peace compulsory in all schools ... we here learn the actual truth for the first time about the Revolution". Farbman's Bolshevism in Retreat was published in London in 1923 and his After Lenin: The New Phase in Russia was published the following year.

He often travelled to the USSR, though by 1928 lived in London with his wife Sonia Issayevna and their daughter Ghita. By December of that year they shared a house in St John's Wood with Ukrainian writer S. S. Koteliansky. Farbman's study on the first five-year plan, Piatiletka: Russia's 5 Year Plan, was published in New York in 1931. It proved very popular in the United States.

Farbman was manager of the Europa book publishing firm. He edited Masterpieces of Russian Painting published by Europa in London in 1930. Farbman also established the Europa Annual, intended to bring coverage of political and economic matters to the masses, and edited the Europa Survey. Farbman died at University College Hospital, London, on 27 May 1933 after a long illness. He was cremated at Golders Green Crematorium on 30 May. In 1940, Farbman was mentioned in the United States Congress by Representative for Montana Jacob Thorkelson as a possible "subversive" who had operated in the West.
