= Zeev Farbman =

Israeli businessman (born 1979)

- זאב פרבמן
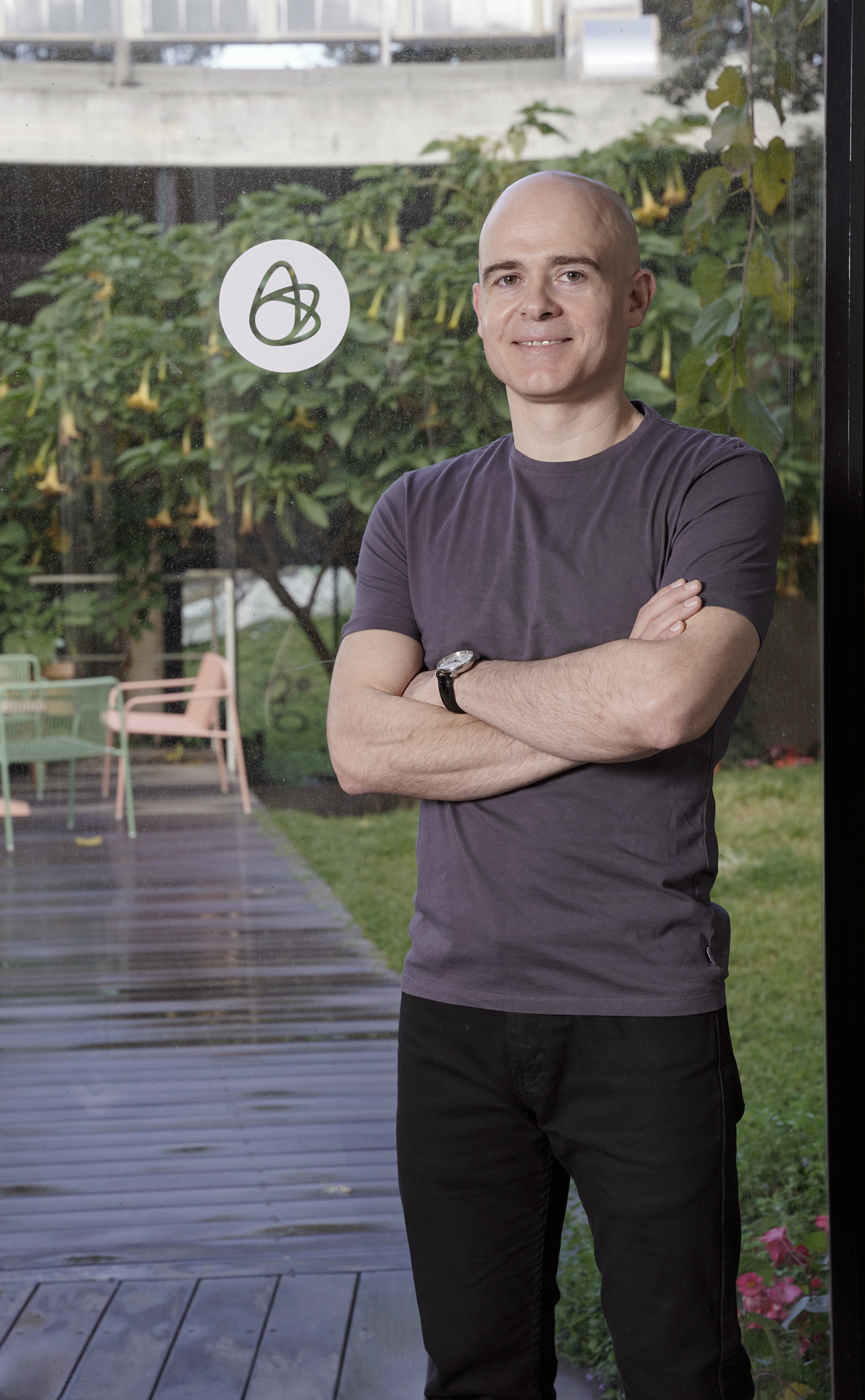
- Farbman in 2022
- Born: September 9, 1979 (age 47); Zaporizhia, Ukrainian SSR, Soviet Union
- Education: Hebrew University of Jerusalem
- Occupation: Businessman
- Known for: Co-founder of Lightricks

Zeev Farbman (Hebrew: זאב פרבמן; born September 9, 1979) is an Israeli businessman. He is a co-founder of Lightricks, a software development company.

== Early life and education ==
Zeev Farbman was born in Zaporizhia on September 9, 1979. He grew up in Yukutia, Russia, before immigrating to Netanya, Israel when he was 13. He graduated from Hebrew University of Jerusalem with a PhD in Computer Science, completed under the guidance of Professor Dani Leshinski and Professor Raanan Fattal.

== Lightricks ==
As a software development company in Jerusalem, Lightricks has been noted by media reports as a startup from outside Tel Aviv.

Pictures of a sleeping Farbman went viral when they were turned into memes.

== Personal ==
In his spare time, Farbman practices Brazilian Jiu-Jitsu.
