= Pura Vida Bracelets =

American online jewelry retailer

- Industry: Handcrafted Jewelry
- Founded: 2010; 16 years ago
- Founder: Griffin Thall; Paul Goodman
- Headquarters: La Jolla, California, United States

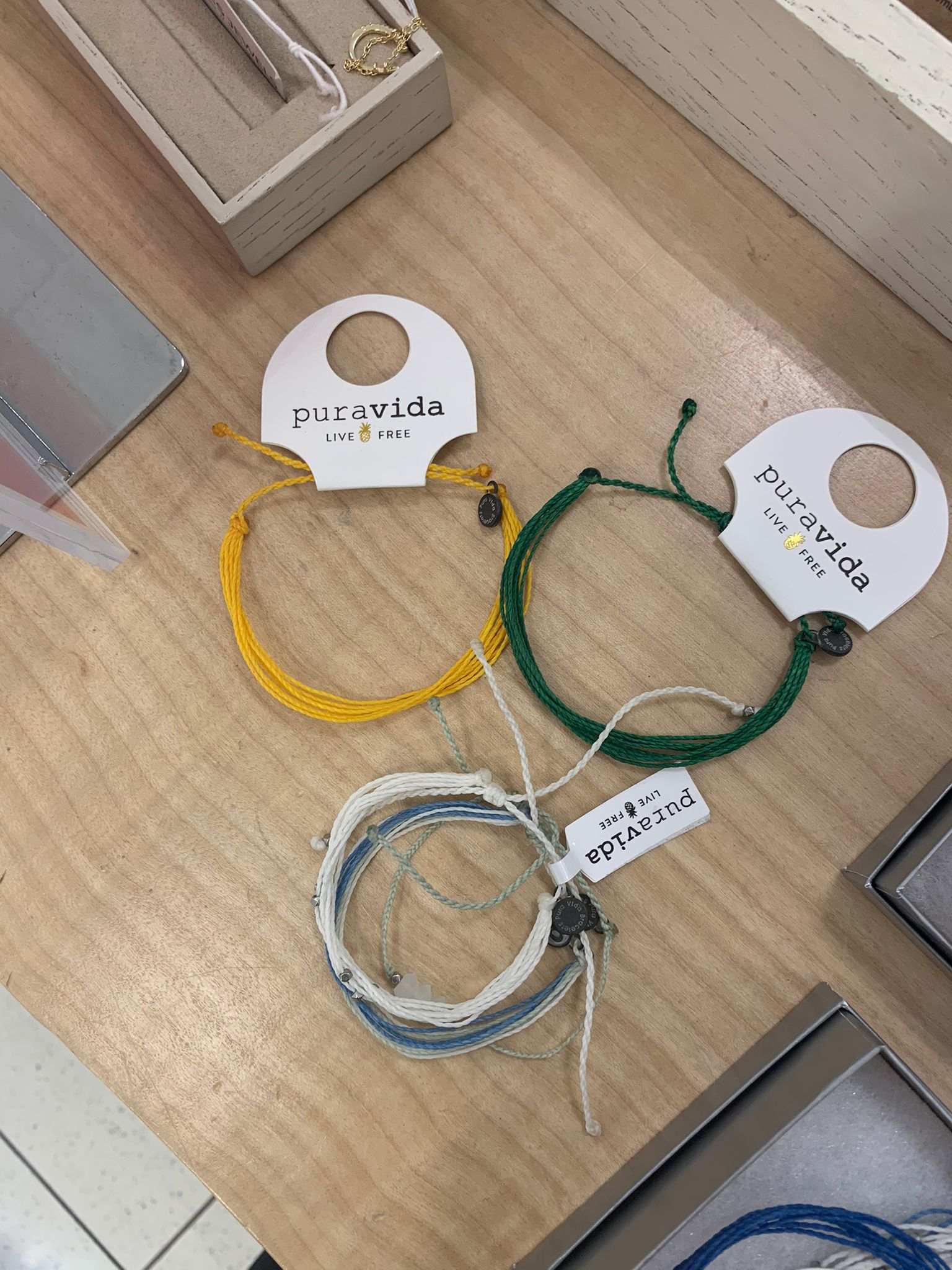
Pura Vida Bracelets

Pura Vida Bracelets is a La Jolla, California–based company that sells hand-crafted bracelets and jewelry online and through boutique stores. It was founded in 2010 by Griffin Thall and Paul Goodman, who created the business having been inspired by Costa Rican culture after discovering the bracelet style while on a vacation in Costa Rica.

Pura Vida means "pure life" in Spanish; in Costa Rica it is said frequently and has many meanings, such as hello, goodbye, or even to say thank you. In an interview, Thall and Goodman called the term "the slogan of Costa Rica, just like the word 'aloha' from Hawaii".

== About ==
The company, which is based in La Jolla, California, was founded by Griffin Thall and Paul Goodman in 2010. Thall and Goodman traveled to Costa Rica together on vacation after graduating from San Diego State University, where they met a pair of bracelet makers named Joaquin and Jorge. They then purchased 400 bracelets for $100 to bring back to the United States. The pair initially sold their original stock at Planet Blue, a small boutique located in Malibu, California. By late 2013, Pura Vida had grown to a dozen US-based staff and 50 Costa Rica–based staff. As of July 2019, the company has over 650 employees that work to create these bracelets.

Pura Vida also creates bracelets for charitable organizations, as a cause marketing fundraiser; bracelets are produced in a charitable organization's colors, and a portion of the sale of those bracelets goes to that charitable organization.

In 2019, Vera Bradley purchased a 75% stakeholder share in Pura Vida’s parent company, Creative Genius. The 75% of the company was valued at $75 million. They have the option to purchase the remainder of the company in 2024.
