= Barbara Bradley Baekgaard =

American fashion designer

- Born: 1939 (age 85–86)

Barbara Bradley Baekgaard (born 1939) is the co-founder, designer, and former Chief Creative Officer of Vera Bradley.

== Biography ==
Barbara Bradley Baekgaard grew up in Miami Beach, Florida. Her first business was a wallpaper-hanging company. Her husband was the owner of a bag company, Baekgaard, which Barbara Bradley Baekgaard managed after he died.

In 1982, Baekgaard and neighbor Patricia Miller were traveling together. They noticed how similar women's travel bags looked and wished they had bags to match their own fun and colorful style. They each borrowed $250 and started making handbags out of high-quality cotton in Baekgaard's basement in Fort Wayne, Indiana, on a ping-pong table. Their business became Vera Bradley, an homage to Barbara Bradley Baekgaard's mother. Within 3 years of business, the sales of the company reached $1 million.

At the time, the bags seemed like they wouldn't amount to much more than a hobby, as Baekgaard hadn't been in the workforce before. To learn about accounting and other financial aspects of running a business, she and Miller went to SCORE, a nonprofit that provides free business mentoring services to small-business owners. Thanks to that formation, Baekgaard, and Miller would officially launch a handbag and luggage company.

Baekgaard founded the Vera Bradley Foundation for Breast Cancer in 1993 after the loss of her dear friend. In 2010, the year Vera Bradley went public, Barbara Bradley Baekgaard became Chief Creative Officer of Vera Bradley.

In August 2017, she stepped down as Chief Creative Officer of Vera Bradley, succeeded by Beatrice Mac Cabe, but remained active with the Vera Bradley Foundation for Breast Cancer. In 2020, she partnered with Provenance Hotels to open The Bradley hotel in Fort Wayne, which she co-owns. She had already ventured in the hotel business with the Inn by the Sea in Seaside, Florida, which sold it in 2013.

== Publications ==
- Vera Bradley: Our Favorite Recipes, 2000
- A Colorful Way of Living: How to Be More, Create More, Do More the Vera Bradley Way, 2017

== Awards ==
- 2016: Ranked 54th in the Forbes America's Self-Made Women.
- 2009: Living Legends by the Indiana Historical Society
- 2007: Country Living Entrepreneur Award
- 2006: Gifts and Decorative Accessories Industry Achievement Award

== Personal life ==
Baekgaard married right after college and had four children in five years. Because of her husband's job, the family moved often. She never had the chance to pursue her passion for entrepreneurship before her 40s. Her husband was of Danish descent. She owns a family house on Lake Gage in Northern Indiana. She lives in Indiana and New York City.

In 2020, Forbes estimated her wealth to be around $210 million. Barbara Bradley Baekgaard owns 7% of the shares of Vera Bradley.
