= Lightricks =

Software development company

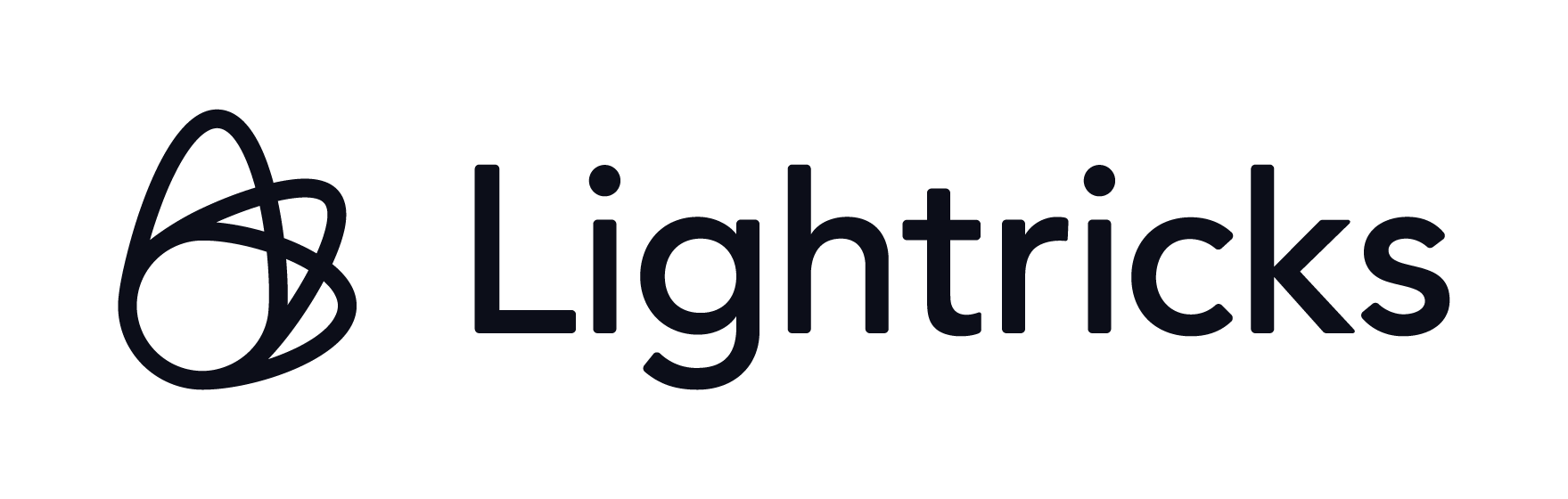
- Type: Private
- Industry: Software development
- Founded: January 2013
- Founders: Zeev Farbman, Nir Pochter, Yaron Inger, Amit Goldstein, Itai Tsiddon
- Headquarters: Jerusalem, Israel
- Products: Facetune, Photoleap, Videoleap, Boosted, Facetune Video, Filtertune, LTX Studio, LTX Video
- Services: Mobile image editing, video editing, generative AI software
- Number of employees: 600
- Website: lightricks.com

Lightricks is a software development company founded in January 2013. The company develops Facetune, a mobile app for image editing, and LTX, a generative text-to-video model. The company is headquartered in Jerusalem, Israel, with approximately 600 employees. The company was valued at $1.8 billion in 2021.

== History ==
AI-generated video of the Tesla Cybertruck based on two photos by OWS Photography. Generated using Lightricks' LTXV 2B model.

The company was created in 2013 by five Ph.D. students, Zeev Farbman, Nir Pochter, Yaron Inger, Amit Goldstein, and former Supreme Court of Israel clerk Itai Tsiddon, who were all studying at the Hebrew University of Jerusalem.

The company headquarters are on the campus of the Hebrew University in Jerusalem with offices in Haifa, London, New York and Chicago. In 2021, Lightricks had 600 employees,but has since cut the workforce by half.

=== Funding and finances ===
Lightricks began life as a bootstrapped company, which was the subject of a case study from the Harvard Business School "Bootstrapping at Lightricks".

In 2015 the company went through its first (series A) funding round, of $10 million, led by Viola Ventures.

In November 2018 Insight Venture Partners led its second (series B) funding round of $60 million, with participation from Israeli VC company ClalTech.

In July 2019, it secured $135 million in series C funding led by Goldman Sachs, with participation from Insight Partners and ClalTech; this was reported to imply a $1 billion valuation.

In September 2021 Lightricks announced a series D funding round, with a valuation of $1.8 billion. The round was co-led by New York-based global private equity and venture capital firm Insight Partners and Hanaco Venture Capital, with participation from existing investors Goldman Sachs, ClalTech, Harel Insurance and Finance and Greycroft, with new investors Migdal Insurance, Altshuler Shaham, and Shavit Capital. The series D round brought Lightricks' total funding to $335 million.

== Business ==
Lightricks ended 2018 with over $50 million in revenue, by July 2025 it had reached $250 million in Annual Recurring Revenues (ARR).

=== Mobile apps ===
- Lightricks launched Facetune, its most popular app, in March 2013. It was named one of App Store's Best of 2013, and was Apple's most downloaded paid app in 2017. It was awarded Google Play's best app of 2014. As of 2023 it has been downloaded over 200 million times.
- Photoleap (formerly known as Photofox and Enlight), a general image editing app, which was preceded by Enlight Photofox. The app allows the user to generate artwork to be shared on social media with a number of different editing options. It was one of the first mobile applications to offer generative AI capabilities and text-to-image.
- Videoleap, a video editor which brought previously complex flows to mobile devices and consumers. It was named Apple's 2017 App of the Year.
- Boosted (formerly known as BoostApps), a graphic design template tool aimed towards social media marketing.
- Facetune Video, a selfie-retouching video tool that allows users to retouch and edit their selfie and portrait videos in real time using a set of A.I.-powered tools.
- Filtertune, a photo filter tool designed to create a community around custom photo filters. With the app, creators can make their own personalized preset photo filters, then share them across social media as photos with a QR code attached.

Once Apple Inc allowed it, Lightricks was one of the first app companies to offer subscriptions. Most of its apps are now published under a freemium model.

=== Creator economy ===
In 2022, as part of its play in the creator economy space, Lightricks acquired Popular Pays, a U.S. based startup, that built and manages an influencer and creator marketing platform of the same name. The goal was to help influencers creating content within Lightricks' mobile apps monetize their work in a more streamlined fashion.

=== Generative AI ===
In the summer of 2022, with the emergence of generative artificial intelligence, Lightricks began incorporating GenAI flows in its apps, including Facetune and Photoleap, becoming one of the first to offer text-to-image capabilities on mobile devices.

In February 2024, Lightricks introduced LTX Studio, a platform for creating and editing videos using AI. In August 2024 it ended its beta phase and was opened to the public. In October 2025 Lightricks revealed that a number of creative agencies, including McCann Paris, were using LTX Studio as part of their workflow.

In November 2024, the company released its own AI image to video generation model, LTX Video, a 2 billion parameter model released as open source. In May 2025 Lightricks released a 13 billion parameter model, capable of generating 5 seconds of video in 4 seconds, and in July 2025 it announced it had broken the 60 second barrier for GenAI videos.

In October 2025 Lightricks released LTX-2, capable of creating 4K-quality video with fully synchronized sound. In January 2026, the company officially made LTX-2 open source, releasing code, benchmarks and trainer data.

Later in 2026 Lightricks partnered with Nvidia, releasing LTX-2.3 in an on-device demo.
