= List of LGBTQ YouTubers =

This list of notable LGBTQ YouTubers includes YouTubers who publicly identify as lesbian, gay, bisexual, transgender, queer or otherwise part of the LGBTQ community.

== List ==
| Name | Nationality | Orientation(s) & identification(s) | Associated channels | Ref. |
|---|---|---|---|---|
| Abigail Thorn | British | Lesbian, transgender | Philosophy Tube, Philosophy Tube Live | |
| Adam Dahlberg | American | Non-binary | SkyDoesMinecraft | |
| Alejo Igoa | Argentine | Gay | Alejo Igoa | |
| Alex Bertie | British | Transgender, pansexual | TheRealAlexBertie | |
| Allan "Cheese" Alvarez | Trinidadian-Spanish | Gay | cheese speedrunning | |
| Andrea Russett | American | Bisexual | Andrea Russett | |
| Anna Akana | American | Queer, bisexual | Anna Akana | |
| Anna Brisbin | American | Bisexual | Brizzy Voices, BrizzyVlogs | |
| Austin Show | American | Gay, bisexual | Austinshow, AustinShow Clips | |
| Miss Benny | American | Transgender, queer | BennySounds, KidPOV, MISS BENNY | |
| Blaire White | American | Transgender | Blaire White | |
| Brandon Rogers | American | Gay | Brandon Rogers | |
| Brendan Jordan | American | Genderfluid | Brendan Jordan | |
| Bria Kam | American | Lesbian | BriaAndChrissy, briakam | |
| Bryanna Nasck | Brazilian | Non-binary | Bryanna Nasck | |
| Bryan Odell | American | Queer | BryanStars | |
| Calum McSwiggan | British | Gay | eatgaylove | |
| Carlinhos Maia | Brazilian | Gay | Carlinhos Maia | |
| Cellbit | Brazilian | Asexual | Cellbit | |
| Charlotte McDonnell | British | Transgender, bisexual | charlieissocoollike | |
| Chris Stuckmann | American | Pansexual | Chris Stuckmann | |
| Chrissy Chambers | American | Lesbian | BriaAndChrissy, Lesbian Love | |
| Clara Sorrenti | Canadian | Transgender | Keffals | |
| Connie Glynn | British | Bisexual | Connie Glynn, Connie | |
| Connor Franta | American | Gay | ConnorFranta, More Connor, our2ndlife | |
| Daniel Howell | British | Queer, gay | Daniel Howell, danisnotinteresting, DanAndPhilGAMES | |
| Dane Boedigheimer | American | Transgender | DaneBoe | |
| Dave Rubin | American | Gay | The Rubin Report | |
| Davey Wavey | American | Gay | Wickydkewl | |
| David K. Smith | British | Gay | ProfessorDaveatYork | |
| Dodie Clark | British | Bisexual | doddleoddle, doddlevloggle, dodieVEVO | |
| Eden Estrada | Mexican-American | Transgender | Eden the Doll | |
| Elijah Daniel | American | Gay | Elijah Daniel, Elijah and Christine, Elijah & Christine etc | |
| Emma Ellingsen | Norwegian | Transgender | Emma Ellingsen | |
| Eugene Lee Yang | American | Gay | The Try Guys | |
| Eva Gutowski | American | Bisexual | MyLifeAsEva, VLOGTOWSKI | |
| Evan Edinger | American-British | Asexual | Evan Edinger, Evan Edinger Travel | |
| F1NN5TER | British | Bisexual, genderfluid | F1nn5terLIVE | |
| GeminiTay | Canadian | Bisexual | GeminiTay, GeminiTwo | |
| Gigi Gorgeous | Canadian | Pansexual, transgender | Gigi Gorgeous | |
| Gregory Brown | Canadian | Gay | AsapSCIENCE, Greg and Mitch | |
| Hank Green | American | Bisexual | vlogbrothers, Crash Course Biology | |
| Hannah Hart | American | Lesbian | My Drunk Kitchen, MyHarto, yourharto | |
| Harry Brewis | British | Bisexual | Hbomberguy, H.BurgerGuy | |
| Hazel Hayes | Irish | Bisexual | Hazel Hayes | |
| Ian Kochinski | American | Pansexual | Vaush, The Vaush Pit | |
| Ingrid Nilsen | American | Lesbian | Ingrid Nilsen | |
| Issa Twaimz | American | Gay | twaimz | |
| J. J. McCullough | Canadian | Gay | J. J. McCullough | |
| Jacob Rabon | American | Bisexual, asexual, aromantic | Alpharad | |
| Jack Baran | American | Gay | thatsojack | |
| Jaiden Dittfach | American | Asexual, aromantic | Jaiden Animations | |
| James Charles | American | Gay | James Charles | |
| Jamie Raines | British | Transgender, bisexual | Jammidodger | |
| Javier Ramírez | Colombian | Gay | Javier Ramírez | |
| Jazz Jennings | American | Transgender, pansexual | Jazz Jennings | |
| Jeffree Star | American | Bisexual, androgynous | Jeffree Star | |
| Jeffrey Marsh | American | Genderqueer | Official Jeffrey Marsh | |
| Jenn McAllister | American | Bisexual | jennxpenn | |
| Jessica Kellgren-Fozard | British | Lesbian | Jessica Kellgren-Fozard | |
| James Stephanie Sterling | British | Pansexual, non-binary | Jim Sterling | |
| Jimmy Fowlie | American | Gay | jimmyfowlie | |
| Jimmy Hill | British | Gay | jimmy0010, Cereal Time | |
| Joey Graceffa | American | Gay | Joey Graceffa | |
| JoJo Siwa | American | Queer, pansexual | Its JoJo Siwa | |
| Jon Cozart | American | Bisexual | Paint | |
| Julie Sondra Decker | American | Asexual, aromantic | swankivy | |
| KallMeKris | Canadian | Pansexual (Note: KallMeKris indicated that she is a member of the LGBTQ+ community and her orientation aligns most closely with pansexuality, but also said that she typically does not associate herself with any labels.) | Kallmekris | |
| Kat Blaque | American | Transgender | Kat Blaque, Kat Blaque Rants | |
| Keara Graves | Canadian | Queer | Keara Graves | |
| Kéfera Buchmann | Brazilian | Bisexual | 5inco Minutos | |
| Krzysztof Gonciarz | Polish | Bisexual | Zapytaj Beczkę, Krzysztof Gonciarz, TheUwagaPies | |
| La Uchulú | Peruvian | Homosexual | La Uchulú | |
| Laci Green | American | Pansexual | lacigreen | |
| Larri Merritt | American | Gay | LARRAY | |
| Lasizwe Dambuza | South African | Gay | Lasizwe Dambuza | |
| Lewis Hancox | English | Transgender | Lewis Hancox | |
| Lex Croucher | British | Non-binary | Lex Croucher | |
| Lilly Singh | Canadian | Bisexual | Lilly Singh, Lilly Singh Vlogs | |
| Lindsay Ellis | American | Bisexual | Lindsay Ellis | |
| Luba | Brazilian | Gay | Luba TV, Luba TV Games | |
| Lucas Cruikshank | American | Gay | FЯED, Lucas, More Lucas | |
| mxmtoon | American | Bisexual | mxmtoon | |
| Malena Nunes | Brazilian | Lesbian | malena010102 | |
| Manuel Gutierrez | American | Gay | Manny Mua | |
| Mathilda Högberg | Swedish | Transgender | Mathilda Hogberg | |
| Max Emerson | American | Gay | max emerson | |
| Max Miller | American | Gay | Tasting History | |
| Meg Turney | American | Bisexual | Meg Turney | |
| Mia Mulder | Swedish | Transgender, bisexual | Mia Mulder | |
| Michael Buckley | American | Pansexual | Buck Hollywood, The New Michael Buckley Channel | |
| Mikel Herrán | Spanish | Bisexual | PutoMikel | |
| Mikey Bustos | Canadian-Filipino | Bisexual | MikeyBustosVideos, MikeyBustosVLOGS, Mikey Bustos Music | |
| Miles McKenna | American | Transgender | MilesChronicles | |
| Mitch Grassi | American | Gay | PTXOfficial, SUPERFRUIT | |
| Mitchell Moffit | Canadian | Gay | AsapSCIENCE, Greg and Mitch, Mitchell Moffit | |
| Natalie Wynn | American | Transgender, lesbian | ContraPoints, ContraPointsLive | |
| Nicolas Sturniolo | American | Gay | Sturniolo Triplets | |
| Nicholas Perry | Ukrainian-American | Gay | Nikocado Avocado | |
| Niki Albon | British | Gay | Niki and Sammy | |
| Nikita Dragun | American | Transgender | Nikita Dragun | |
| Nikkie de Jager | Dutch | Transgender | NikkieTutorials | |
| Pedro Luis Joao | Venezuelan | Gay | La Divaza | |
| Phil Lester | British | Gay | AmazingPhil, LessAmazingPhil, DanAndPhilGAMES | |
| Rickey Thompson | American | Gay | Rickey Thompson, Rickey Thompson Vlogs | |
| Ricky Dillon | American | Gay | Ricky Dillon | |
| Rob Anderson | American | Gay | Rob Anderson | |
| Rose Ellen Dix | British | Lesbian | Rose Ellen Dix, TheRoxetera, Let's Play Games | |
| Rosie Spaughton | British | Bisexual | TheRoxetera, Let's Play Games | |
| Rowan Ellis | British | Asexual lesbian | Rowan Ellis | |
| Ryland Adams | American | Gay | Ryland Adams | |
| Sam Tsui | American | Gay | TheSamTsui | |
| Scott Hoying | American | Gay | PTXOfficial, SUPERFRUIT | |
| Shane Dawson | American | Bisexual | Shane, Shane Dawson TV, Human Emoji | |
| Shannon Beveridge | American | Lesbian | Nowthisisliving | |
| Shaylee Curnow | Australian | Lesbian | Peach PRC | |
| Stef Sanjati | Canadian | Transgender | Stef Sanjati | |
| Steven Kenneth Bonnell II | American | Bisexual | Destiny, Last Night On Destiny, Destiny Clips | |
| Tana Mongeau | American | Pansexual | Tana Mongeau | |
| Thomas Sanders | American | Gay | Thomas Sanders, Roxas424, Thomas Sanders and Friends | |
| TJ Kirk | American | Bisexual | TJ Kirk, The Drunken Peasants Podcast, Deep Fat Fried | |
| Todrick Hall | American | Gay | todrickhall | |
| Trevi Moran | American | Transgender | Trevi Moran, our2ndlife | |
| Trisha Paytas | American | Non-binary | blndsundoll4mj, Trisha Paytas | |
| Trixie Mattel | American | Gay | Trixie Mattel | |
| Troye Sivan | Australian-South African | Gay | Troye Sivan, TroyeSivanVEVO | |
| Tuure Boelius | Finnish | Gay | Tuure Boelius | |
| Tyler Oakley | American | Gay | Tyler Oakley, extratyler | |
| Vivienne Medrano | American | Bisexual, Asexual | Vivziepop, xZoOPhobiAX | |
| Willam Belli | American | Gay | Willam Belli | |
| Malinda Kathleen Reese | American | Bisexual | MALINDA | |
| Mel Baggs | American | Non-binary | silentmiaow | |
