= Leadley =

English singer-songwriter, YouTuber, and actress (born 1995)

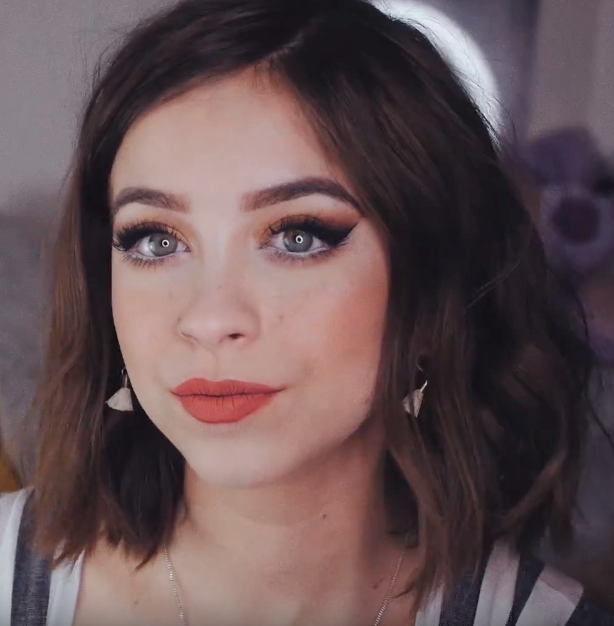
- Leadley in 2019

Background information
- Born: Bethan Mary Leadley; 15 December 1995 (age 30); Crawley, West Sussex, England
- Genres: Indie pop; synth-pop; pop punk; acoustic; indie folk
- Instruments: Vocals; guitar; keyboard
- Years active: 2007–present
- Label: LAB
- Education: Portsmouth College
- Partner: Elyar Fox (2017–present)

YouTube information
- Channel: Leadley
- Subscribers: 282 thousand
- Views: 6.32 million

Bethan Mary Leadley (born 15 December 1995) is an English singer-songwriter, YouTuber, presenter, and actress.

== Early life and education ==
Leadley was born in Crawley, West Sussex. She has an older brother, Daniel, who is married to Hannah Witton. Leadley attended Woking High School in Woking, Surrey followed by Portsmouth College in Portsmouth, Hampshire.

== Career ==
=== Music and YouTube ===
==== Bethan Mary Leadley / musicalbethan (2007–2014) ====
Leadley began posting videos to her YouTube channel (formerly musicalbethan) in April 2007, although her main channel videos from prior to 2011 have been since deleted. She then started two side channels; acousticbethan in 2010 and justbefon in 2012. Her channels have consisted of covers, original songs, vlogs, interviews with the likes of Union J and Ellie Goulding, and more.

Leadley released a single "Day Affair" in collaboration with mental health charity, Time to Change in June 2014.

==== Bethan Leadley / musicalbethan (2014–2017) ====
Leadley released her first EP, New Kinda New as Bethan Leadley under LAB Records in November 2014 with producers Jon Gaskin and Ande Mello from Fort Hope. It was then announced Leadley would set out on her first tour via Kililive in January 2015 with performances in Bristol, Birmingham, London, Nottingham, Manchester and Glasgow. She was accompanied by Box of Light and Dodie Clark. Leadley supported Lucy Spraggan on tour that May, Union J at British Summer Time 2015, and The Midnight Beast on tour that September.

In September 2015, Leadley uploaded a charity cover of Birdy's "People Help the People" for Save the Children. Later in November, her second EP, Inside Her Head was released, this time with a more pop punk sound and delving into personal issues Leadley dealt with growing up. The third track on the EP, "Fall for You", received a nomination for YouTuber song of the Year at the 2016 Summer in the City Awards and the music video featured a number of YouTubers, including Dodie Clark, Hannah Witton, Emma Blackery, Orla Gartland, Niki and Sammy Albon, Elyar, the Mandeville Sisters, and more.

In 2015 and 2016, Leadley made appearances on YouTube channel CokeTV presented by Dodie Clark, including a duet with Clark, "Gold Star for Me".

In February 2016, Leadley signed with Kililive backed talent agency Free Focus. That same year, she supported The Rocket Summer on the acoustic stage at Slam Dunk Festival 2016.

==== Leadley (2017–present) ====
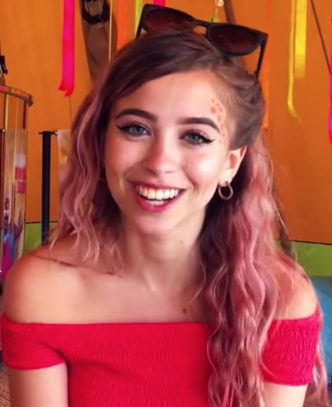
Leadley in 2017

Shifting her main focus towards music and her genre, she rebranded to Leadley with single "All of You" to debut the new moniker in August 2017. The song was co-written by Iain Mahanty and the music video was directed by Mandy Celine.

A self-titled EP followed in November 2018 featuring Dodie Clark and Lucy Moon as back-up vocals and co-writing by Stefan Abingdon. The first single off this EP was "Like I Did", released in July 2018 with a music video in September directed by Abingdon and filmed at the Old Joinery in Greenwich, London. The second was "Never Knew Love", which was released in August and its music video in November. It was filmed by her boyfriend, Elyar. She then in December filmed the music video for his song, "Mango", in return. Both were filmed on their holiday in Rhodes.

Leadley's next single, "Chic", along with its music video directed by Mandy Celine, had a 9 August 2019 release. Leadley supported Tessa Violet on the UK and Europe legs of her 'I Like (The Idea Of) Tour' in October and November 2019. When she got home, she released singles "Money" and "23", which she had debuted live on tour.

In 2020, she released "Nightmare" and "Summer Lovin'". The cover for the former features art by digital artist Laura Brouwers (Cyarin/Cyarine). In March 2022, Leadley released her fourth EP overall and second under the Leadley moniker Dark Pop, containing "23", "Nightmare", her 2021 single "Sinner", and 2022 single "I'm Not That Girl (Anymore)". In summer 2022, Leadley supported Kid Rain and was part of the Climate Live, Edgbaston Stadium, and Reading Pride line-ups.

Also in 2022, Leadley released the singles "New Shoes" and "Crush", which would form part of her 2023 EP Light Pop along with earlier singles "Chic" and "Love Me Like That" as well as new songs.

=== Television and film ===
I 2015, Leadley began working for 4Music presenting The UK Music Video Chart, which aired on Saturdays at 5pm. In 2016, she was given a second gig on the network titled What's Upfront on Mondays at 6pm. The shows were broadcast on 4Music, Box Hits, and The Box.

Leadley also hosted TransmitterTV's coverage of the 2015 Brit Awards.

Leadley starred as the main character Chloe Murdoch in the 2016 independent horror film The Darkest Dawn (originally titled Hungerford 2).

== Artistry ==
Between her ventures, Leadley describes music as her "first love". Although she has been writing lyrics from as young as 8, she wrote her first full song, "Then I Go", shortly after her parents' divorce when she was 13 or 14. Leadley cites that writing music has helped her through difficult times and much of her music is based on real life experiences, either her own or those of her friends. As she has moved from folk/acoustic to pop punk to pop in terms of her sound, Leadley has stated that her inspirations have changed over time. Damien Rice's O, which her father used to play in the car, made her "fall in love with songwriting to begin with."

== Personal life ==
Leadly has been in a relationship with the singer Elyar since February 2017. They officially moved in together in December 2020, and are currently based in Birmingham.

In April 2023, Leadley went viral on TikTok when she revealed she had been diagnosed with primary ovarian insufficiency (POI).

== Discography ==
=== Extended plays ===
List of extended plays
Title	Details
New Kinda New (as Bethan Leadley)	Released: 2 November 2014; Label: LAB Records; Formats: digital download, streaming
Inside Her Head (as Bethan Leadley)	Released: 20 November 2015; Label: Independent; Formats: digital download, streaming
Leadley	Released: 23 November 2018; Label: Independent; Formats: digital download, streaming
Dark Pop	Released: 18 March 2022; Label: Independent; Formats: digital download, streaming
Light Pop	Released: December 2023

=== Singles ===
Year	Song	Album
2014	"Day Affair"	Non-album single
2017	"All of You"	Non-album single
2018	"Like I Did"	Leadley
2018	"Never Knew Love"	Leadley
2019	"Chic"	Light Pop
2019	"Money"	Non-album single
2019	"23"	Dark Pop
2020	"Nightmare"	Dark Pop
2020	"Summer Lovin'"	Non-album single
2020	"Love Me Like That"	Light Pop
2021	"Sinner"	Dark Pop
2022	"I'm Not That Girl (Anymore)"	Dark Pop
2022	"New Shoes"	Light Pop
2022	"Crush"	Light Pop
2023	"Love for the Last Time"	Light Pop
2025	"Freestyle"	Non-album single

Year	Song
2015	"One for the Road" (with Dodie Clark)
2015	"Shoot All Your Problems Away" (with TomSka)
2016	"Gold Star for Me" (with Dodie Clark; for CokeTV)
2019	"A Whole New World" (Creators' Cover for Disney Studios UK)

=== Music videos ===
Year	Song	Director
2014	"Left the Broken" (lyric video)	
2014	"Safe Lined"	
2015	"Your Storm"	
2015	"Fall For You"	
2017	"All of You"	Mandy Celine
2018	"Like I Did"	Stefan Abingdon
2018	"Never Knew Love"	Elyar
2019	"Chic"	Mandy Celine
2019	"Money"	
2020	"Nightmare"	Herself
2020	"Summer Lovin'"	
2020	"Love Me Like That"	Jack Howard
2021	"Sinner"	Jack Howard
2022	"I'm Not That Girl (Anymore)"	Ami Bevilacqua
2022	"Crush"	Herself
2023	"Love for the Last Time"	Herself

== Filmography ==
Year	Title	Role	Notes
2016	The Darkest Dawn	Chloe Murdoch	Film; originally titled Hungerford 2
2017	"6/10"		Music video by dodie

== Awards and nominations ==
Year	Show	Award	Nominee	Result	Ref.
2016	Summer in the City Awards	YouTuber Song of the Year	"Fall For You"	Nominated	
