= Alex Bertie =

Former British YouTuber (born 1995)

- Born: 2 November 1995 (age 30); Dorset, England, United Kingdom
- Education: Bournemouth and Poole College
- Occupation: Former YouTuber
- Years active: 2010–2018
- Known for: LGBTQ+ activism
- Notable work: Trans Mission: My Quest for a Beard
- Awards: Silver Creator Button; Creator For Change Award

Alex Bertie (born 2 November 1995) is a British author, LGBTQ+ advocate, Game art designer, and former YouTube personality. He is best known for his YouTube channel, TheRealAlexBertie, where he openly documented his experiences as a transgender man.

Bertie has been praised for his ability to communicate the challenges and triumphs of transitioning in an accessible and relatable manner. His videos covered topics such as hormone therapy, gender, gender dysphoria, top surgery, and mental health, as well as broader LGBTQ+ issues. In 2014 he participated in the LGBTQ+ Panel at Summer in the City, a gathering for the UK YouTube community, alongside fellow YouTubers Tyler Oakley and Gary C. He has also been a featured panelist for Summer in the City in 2015, 2016, 2017, and 2018.

In 2017, Bertie published a memoir, Trans Mission: My Quest to a Beard, which provided a detailed account of his transition and the struggles of being transgender in a society that often lacks understanding. The book was well-received for its heartfelt and informative approach, though it was banned in some schools due to its LGBTQ+ themes.

In recent years, Bertie has moved away from content creation, opting for a career in user experience design and user interface while continuing to engage in LGBTQ+ advocacy.

== Early life and education ==
Bertie was raised in Bournemouth, Dorset, England. Assigned female at birth, he grew up in a small-town environment, which, according to his accounts, often made it difficult to explore his gender identity freely. As a child, he gravitated towards interests that were traditionally associated with boys, feeling disconnected from societal expectations on him due to his assigned gender. However, without the language to articulate his experiences, he initially struggled to understand why he felt different. In primary school all his friends were male. He experienced bullying for a three-year stretch because of his perceived non-heterosexuality, and also dealt with depression because of how society treated his gender dysphoria. He engaged in self-harm cutting, but later found relief from an LGBTQ-affirming group, Over the Rainbow, that shared information about transgender people.

During his early teenage years, Bertie first encountered the term "transgender" while exploring online communities, which helped him better understand his identity. He initially identified as a lesbian before realizing that his feelings of discomfort extended beyond sexuality. At the age of 15, he came out as transgender to his family, friends, and YouTube audience, beginning his journey of self-discovery and transition. His family was hesitant to support early on, but Bertie describes the period as "supportive in their own way", where his father would not use any pronouns or any names towards Alex. After struggling for family acceptance, in April 2016 he began hormone replacement treatment at The Laurels Gender Identity Clinic in Exeter, England. His younger sister embraced his gender transitioning first, his parents took longer but are now extremely supportive. In January 2017, he underwent a double mastectomy procedure (Peri-Areolar technique) by Andrew Yelland at the Nuffield Hospital, Brighton. He titled his YouTube channel "The Quest to Alex's Beard" and included the highs and lows of the journey, including his family's slowly accepting his transition, so that other young trans men and women could see "it gets better". In October 2017, The Mail on Sunday published photos of Bertie without permission alongside what PinkNews characterized as the latest in a series of anti-trans articles.

Bertie pursued art and design at Bournemouth and Poole College. While he initially considered a career in graphic design, his growing online presence and increasing role as an LGBTQ+ advocate shifted his focus toward education, content creation, and writing.

Throughout his transition, Bertie documented personal experiences, including challenges related to medical transition, mental health, and societal perceptions of gender.

== YouTube career ==
TheRealAlexBertie was launched in March 2010 as a creative outlet to document personal experiences and share insights about LGBTQ+ topics. Initially, his content focused on general vlogging, digital art, and personal interests, but as he became more comfortable around his identity, his channel evolved into an educational platform centered around transgender experiences.

Over the years, Bertie collaborated with other LGBTQ+ YouTubers and activists, expanding conversations about gender identity and inclusivity.

In 2016, Bertie appeared in a video with United Kingdom's Childline to dismantle myths surrounding transgender children.

Bertie gained recognition for his candid discussions about transitioning, gender dysphoria, and LGBTQ+ issues. He openly documented significant milestones in his transition, including starting Hormone replacement therapy, undergoing top surgery, and navigating social and medical aspects of being transgender in the United Kingdom. Bertie's channel had gained 16 million views and over 300k subscribers. Addressing his reduced presence as an influencer, Bertie stated, "In recent years my social media presence has moved more towards my love of gaming, where I occasionally stream on Twitch. My Graphic Design career has meant that my life as an influencer has taken a back seat, however I would never say this is a closed door."

As of 2025 his content and YouTube channel have been deleted from the platform.

== Unauthorized use of images ==
In October 2017, The Daily Mail published an article titled "NHS pressured our kids to change sex," which included transition photos of Alex Bertie without his consent. The article, which also carried the subheading "Transgender backlash as desperate parents accuse overzealous therapists of ‘blindly accepting’ children’s claims to have been born in wrong body,” used these images to support a narrative suggesting that young people were being influenced to transition, a claim that Bertie strongly opposed.

Following the publication, Bertie publicly criticized the unauthorized use of his photos, referring to the article as a "hateful anti-trans piece." He stated on social media that he was "FUMING" over what he viewed as misrepresentation and misuse of his personal images.

== Personal life ==
Bertie is pansexual and has increasingly prioritized privacy in recent years, stepping back from regular public appearances and content creation. Despite this, he remains committed to LGBTQ+ advocacy through his work as a writer and speaker. He currently resides in Cheshire, with his two cats. He has a sister named Hollie and is currently in a long term relationship. He and his partner met at a youth group and seven months later started dating.

== Awards and recognition ==
In 2018, Alex Bertie was shortlisted for the Polari First Book Prize for his memoir, Trans Mission: My Quest to a Beard, the award celebrates debut LGBTQ+ writers and their contributions to literature. Bertie has also been recognized for his impact as a digital creator. He received a Lovie Award from the International Academy of Science in the Creator for Change category, which honors individuals using digital media to drive social change. Additionally, Bertie was awarded YouTube's Silver Play Button for surpassing 100,000 subscribers on his channel, TheRealAlexBertie.
