= Laura Brouwers =

Laura Brouwers may refer to:

- Laura Brouwers (artist), Dutch digital artist and illustrator
- Laura Brouwers (cricketer), Dutch cricketer
