= Social in the City =

UK social media marketing event

- Status: Active
- Genre: Online Video
- Venue: Royal Parks of London (2009–2012); Alexandra Palace (2013–2014); ExCeL London (2018–2019); nec (Winter Edition 2019)
- Locations: London; Birmingham
- Country: United Kingdom
- Inaugurated: August 28–30, 2009
- Most recent: August 9–11, 2019
- Attendance: 2015: 10,000
- Website: sitc-event.co.uk

Social in the City (often styled as SitC), formerly Summer in the City, is an annual three-day multi-genre online video event held in London, dedicated to content creators and community from a range of social media platforms such as YouTube, Twitch, TikTok and Instagram.

The first Summer in the City in 2009 was a gathering of YouTubers in the parks of London. In 2016, SitC was acquired by MCM Expo Group as part of their "MCM Central" brand. After SitC 2019 the event was rebranded as Social in the City, the first Winter Edition in December took place at the National Exhibition Centre.

== History ==
=== 2009–2011 (London Parks) ===
The first Summer in the City was held in London, as a traditional YouTube gathering. It was organised by vlogger Tom Burns and YouTube musician Dave Bullas, with the support of Liam Dryden and Jazza John. The three-day event was held in the last weekend of August and took place across several of London's Royal Parks. The largest attendance at any point was reportedly 200 people, a mix of YouTube creators and viewers.

In its first three years, the event followed the pattern of meeting in parks by day, and moving to a London venue such as The Luminaire for live music performances in the evening.

=== 2012 (The Brewery) ===
Following the rapid growth of the event, the decision was made to hold the fourth Summer in the City at a dedicated venue for its duration; SitC 2012 took place at The Brewery in London from 17 to 19 August. This was the first year the event would introduce official programming, including workshops and Q&As from creators, as well as an official livestream on the event's YouTube channel.

The number of prospective attendees at SitC 2012 exceeded the 1,000-person capacity of the venue, inspiring the need to move away from being a free event and introduce ticketing in following years.

=== 2013–2014 (Alexandra Palace) ===
SitC's first official ticketed event and the fifth event overall was held in London's Alexandra Palace, with an increased capacity of 7,000 attendees. Backlash over the announcement that the event would now charge admission before confirming the venue, dates or line-up of featured creators resulted in the cut of early ticket prices to £10 plus VAT.

Accompanying 2013's event was a spin-off tour called the Summer Warm-Up, which involved creators from the SitC 2013 line-up touring through some of the UK's major cities, to perform one-off gigs in the build-up to the main event in London. The 2013 SitC was also the introduction of formal meet & greets, where fans would wait in line to meet popular YouTubers from the lineup. The high demand of creators along with the "first come, first served" model of the meet & greets resulted in the decision to add additional ticketing to the meet & greets in 2014.

The sixth event SitC 2014 attracted over 8,000 attendees. The event started with a Creator Day on Friday with panels targeted towards creators rather than fans. Continuing issues with the demand for SitC's meet & greets in 2014 inspired the development of an online ballot system, that has since been implemented in following events.

=== 2015–2019 (ExCeL London) ===
Summer in the City moved to ExCeL for its seventh year which increased its overall capacity to 10,000 attendees. Upon the preliminary announcement of the venue and ticket sales in January 2015, nine influential creators from talent network Gleam including Zoella, Alfie Deyes and Joe Sugg simultaneously announced they would not be attending 2015's event, favouring plans for their own event titled Amity Fest. SitC 2015 hosted the presentation of several YouTube Play Button awards to creators who had recently hit milestones of 100,000 or 1 million subscribers on their channels, and NME stated that vlogging has become big business.

In February 2016, SitC joined MCM Expo Group. The first event hosted under the MCM ownership took place 12–14 August 2016. Emma Blackery published three SitC 2017 videos in her vlog and won in the "Song of the Year" category. Other winners included Hannah Witton, TomSka, Dodie Clark, and Rose and Rosie.

SitC 2019 featured panelists Hannah Witton, Tom Scott and others. After this event Tom Burns announced that Summer in the City would be rebranded as Social in the City. The first Social in the City: Winter Edition took place at the National Exhibition Centre in December.

== Summer in the City Awards ==
SitC 2016 was the debut of the Summer in the City Awards, an event dedicated to presenting community-nominated awards such as "Best Vlogger" and "YouTuber Book Of The Year" to winning creators on the mainstage.

=== 2016 ===
Niki and Sammy Albon were the first hosts of the Summer in the City Awards.

Breakthrough Award	Vlogger of the Year
Adrian Bliss; Daniel J. Layton; Jake Mitchell; Jana Dam; Mark Ferris; Connie Glynn (Noodlerella)	Nathan Zed; Dodie Clark; Evan Edinger; Rose and Rosie; Saffron Barker; Louise Pentland
YouTuber Series of the Year	YouTuber Book of the Year
Jack and Dean – Jack and Dean of All Trades; Hannah Witton – Drunk Advice; Rose and Rosie – Let's Play Games; Hazel Hayes – Time of the Month; Niki and Sammy – Twins Carpool; Adrian Bliss – Vlune	Dan and Phil – The Amazing Book Is Not on Fire; Zoella – Girl Online; Carrie Hope Fletcher – On the Other Side; Tanya Burr – Tanya Bakes; Savannah Brown – graffiti; Tyler Oakley – Binge
Short film of the Year	Community Spirit Award
Bertie Gilbert – Let it Be; Sammy Paul – Friend Like Me; PJ Liguori – Hair and Brimstone; Shane Dawson – It Gets Worse; Ewan McIntosh – RUBIX; Hazel Hayes – Septem	TomSka; Carrie Hope Fletcher; Dodie Clark; Grace Victory; Rose and Rosie; Suli Breaks
YouTuber Song of the Year
Dodie Clark – "Sick of Losing Soulmates"; Emma Blackery – "Sucks to be You" (runner-up); Bry – "Don't Go Alone"; Bethan Leadley – "Fall For You"; Jon Cozart – "YouTube Culture Song"; Tessa Violet – "Not Over You"

=== 2017 ===
Tom Burns hosted in 2017.

Creator Book of the Year	Creator Series of the Year
Hannah Witton – Doing It; Carrie Hope Fletcher – All That She Can See; Dan and Phil – Dan and Phil Go Outside; Oli White – Generation Next: The Takeover; Louise Pentland – Wilde Like Me	TomSka – Last Week; Daniel J. Layton – Baking with Layton; Rosie Spaughton – Bisexy; Hannah Witton – The Hormone Diaries; Jack and Dean – Jack and Dean of All Trades
Film of the Year	Artisan Award
Bertie Gilbert – My Sister; Sam Saffold-Geri – Comfort Food; Hazel Hayes – Hot Mess; Mikey Murphy – Perception; Sammy Paul – Playground	Jamie Jo; Anna Brisbin; PJ Liguori; SORTEDfood; Matt Adlard (Topless Baker)
Fashion & Beauty Award	Community Spirit Award
Saffron Barker; Floral Princess; Jasmine Clough; Leyla Rose; Lewys Ball	Em Ford; Dodie Clark; Kingsley; Scola Dondo; Saffron Barker
Breakthrough Award	Vlogger of the Year
Dodie Clark	Rose and Rosie; Alex Wassabi; Daniel J. Layton; Emma Blackery; Millie T; Saffron Barker
Song of the Year
Emma Blackery – "Nothing Without You"; Dodie Clark – "6/10"; Sarah Close – "Call Me Out"; GOAT – "Grenade"; Tessa Violet – "Words Ain't Enough"

=== 2018 ===
The 2018 ceremony was again hosted by Tom Burns.

Streamer of the Year	Gamer of the Year
Gee Nelson; Jordan Richards; Scott Major; Kayla Sims; Alia Shelesh	Callum Knight; Scott Major; LDShadowLady; Clare Siobhán; Simi (tamago2474)
Community Spirit Award	Vlogger of the Year
Hannah Witton	Saffron Barker; Anastasia Kingsnorth; Molly Thompson; Family Fizz; MacDoesIt; TomSka
Breakthrough Award	Creator Series of the Year
Family Fizz	Hazel Hayes – PrankMe; Carrie Hope Fletcher – Watch Me, Wednesday!; Amelia Dimoldenberg – Chicken Shop Date; Daniel J. Layton – Aspects; Shane Dawson – The Truth About Tanacon
Creator Video of the Year	Fashion & Beauty Award
Elle Mills – COMING OUT (ELLE MILLS STYLE); Family Fizz – EMOTiONAL HOME BiRTH WiTH OUR KiDS!! **life changing**; Jack and Dean – The Goblin; Hannah Witton – Learning to Love My New Body | Mini Doc; PJ Liguori – OCEAN KID	Anastasia Kingsnorth; Lana Summer; Lewys Ball; Saffron Barker; Sophie (sophdoesnails); Syd and Ell
Book of the Year	Song of the Year
Carrie Hope Fletcher – When the Curtain Falls; Connie Glynn – Undercover Princess; Dodie Clark – Secrets for the Mad: Obsessions, Confessions and Life Lessons; Tom and Giovanna Fletcher – Eve of Man; Saffron Barker – Saffron Barker Vs Real Life	Tessa Violet – "Crush"; Dodie Clark – "Burned Out"; Emma Blackery – "Agenda"; HRVY – "Personal"; Orla Gartland – "I Go Crazy"
