= The Bromfords School =

Location
- Grange Avenue; Wickford, Essex, SS12 0LZ; England; 51°36′18″N 0°30′30″E

Information
- Type: Academy
- Motto: Achieve Enrich Prepare
- Established: 1973
- Department for Education URN: 139181 Tables
- Ofsted: Reports
- Headteacher: Jochen Tree
- Gender: Coeducational
- Age: 11 to 18
- Enrolment: 1,118 (2024)
- Houses: Ignis; Aqua; Terra; Ventus
- Colour: Red Blue Yellow Green
- Website: www.bromfords.essex.sch.uk

The Bromfords School is a coeducational secondary school and sixth form with academy status, located in Wickford, Essex, England. Most pupils live in Wickford, while a large minority of pupils live in nearby Basildon and other neighbouring towns. The sixth form is smaller than average.

== History ==
The Bromfords School was opened in 1973, and was originally designed to facilitate 1,000 pupils.^{[1]} The building contained six science labs, technical rooms and language facilities. In 1978, a second "phase" began construction which involved the addition of English and Mathematics departments, a school library and a main hall. The third phase expanded the school to provide the average types of departments at the time.

In 1996, the school was awarded specialist school status, as a Technology College.

In 2007, the school was expanded and renovated again, adding a two-storey building which provided eight new classrooms.^{[2]} The renovation included cladding the buildings in a blue panelling, similar to the neighbouring Grange Primary School. It was part of the Building Schools for the Future programme. This increased the capacity of the school from 1,060 to 1,200 pupils.^{[2]}

In January 2013, the school was converted to academy status.

== Notable former pupils ==
- Footballer Dan Bentley
- Big Brother winner Brian Belo
- YouTuber Emma Blackery
- Big Brother winner Chantelle Houghton
