= 2016 BBC Music Awards =

- Date: 12 December 2016
- Location: ExCeL London
- Hosted by: Fearne Cotton; Claudia Winkleman; Gemma Cairney; Niki & Sammy Albon (backstage)
- Website: https://www.bbc.co.uk/events/ez22mb

Television/radio coverage
- Network: BBC One; BBC Radio 1; BBC Radio 2

The 2016 BBC Music Awards took place on 12 December in London at ExCeL London. Two new awards were introduced, the BBC Radio 1 Live Lounge Performance of the Year award and the BBC Radio 2 Album of the Year award. The first winner of the former was The 1975, who performed "What Makes You Beautiful" (originally by One Direction) and the winner of the latter award was Adele for her album 25. Adele was also nominated for Artist of the Year, but lost out to Coldplay in that category.

== Hosts ==
The awards were hosted by Fearne Cotton, Claudia Winkleman and Gemma Cairney. Niki and Sammy Albon were backstage hosts.

== Performances ==
Artist(s)	Song(s)
The 1975	"The Sound"
Lukas Graham	"7 Years"
Emeli Sandé	"Breathing Underwater"
Coldplay	"Everglow"
John Legend	"All of Me" "Love Me Now"
Izzy Bizu	"White Tiger"
Kaiser Chiefs	"Hole In My Soul"
Craig David	"Re-Rewind (The Crowd Say Bo Selecta)"" "Aint Giving Up"
Zara Larsson	"Lush Life" "I Would Like"
Robbie Williams	"Sensational"

== Nominations and winners ==
British Artist of the Year	Album of the Year
Coldplay; Adele; David Bowie; Jess Glynne; Calvin Harris	Adele – 25; Rick Astley – 50; Coldplay – A Head Full of Dreams; Michael Kiwanuka – Love & Hate; Jeff Lynne's ELO – Alone in the Universe
Song of the Year	Radio 1 Live Lounge Performance of the Year
Adele – "Hello"; Justin Bieber – "Sorry"; Alessia Cara – "Here"; Coldplay featuring Beyoncé – "Hymn for the Weekend"; DNCE – "Cake by the Ocean"; Drake featuring WizKid and Kyla – "One Dance"; Lukas Graham – "7 Years"; Naughty Boy featuring Beyoncé and Arrow Benjamin – "Runnin' (Lose It All)"; Rihanna featuring Drake – "Work"; Justin Timberlake – "Can't Stop the Feeling!"	The 1975, Live Lounge Symphony – "What Makes You Beautiful"; Christine and the Queens – "Sorry"; Craig David – "Love Yourself"; Emeli Sandé – "Hurts"; Usher – "Climax"
BBC Introducing Award
Izzy Bizu
