= Hannah Witton =

British YouTuber

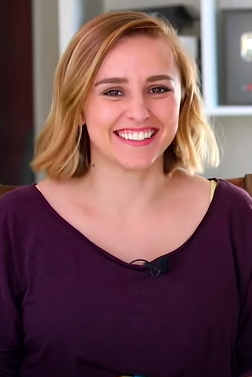
- Witton in 2019
- Born: Hannah Lisa Witton; Manchester, England
- Education: University of Birmingham (BA)
- Occupations: YouTuber; author; talk show host
- Spouse: Daniel Leadley (m. 2020)
- Children: 1

YouTube information
- Channel: Hannah Witton
- Years active: 2009–present
- Genres: Vlogging; sex; feminism
- Subscribers: 743 thousand
- Views: 121 million
- Last updated: 23 April 2026
- Website: hannahwitton.com

Hannah Lisa Witton is an English and German YouTuber, broadcaster, and author. She creates video blogs centred around parenthood, fashion, food and lifestyle. Until 2024, she produced educational content on relationships, sex and sexual health, and other intersecting issues.

Witton's debut book, Doing It, concentrating on sex and relationships, was released for European readers on 6 April 2017 and in the US on 3 July 2018. Her second book, The Hormone Diaries: The Bloody Truth About Our Periods, was released in June 2019.

== Early life and education ==
Though she grew up in England, Witton lived in Austin, Texas for one year as a child. She is Jewish. Her godfather is the actor Toby Jones. She attended Loreto Sixth Form College in Hulme, Manchester, and then the University of Birmingham where she studied a degree in History, and was especially interested in sexual history. Witton's video History of Homosexuality was a 2013 finalist in The Guardian and Oxford University Press Very Short Film competition.

== Career ==
In 2017 Witton won a UK Blog Award, and in 2018 a Blogosphere Award as Vlogger of the Year. As of early 2026, her YouTube channel has amassed almost 100,000 subscribers. She produces paid content for her community on Patreon. She runs a consultancy and project management business providing support to other content creators.

=== YouTube ===
Witton began creating YouTube videos on 17 April 2011 as Hannah "Girasol". She is known for her videos helping young women with sexual health and relationships. She moderated the Gender panel at Summer in the City 2014. Witton was named one of eight Girls' Champions as part of the BBC's 100 Women campaign in November 2016.

Hannah Witton was one of the three members of the internet-based reading club, known as "Banging Book Club". She and fellow YouTubers, Lucy Moon and Leena Norms, read one book every month and then discussed the book together on a podcast published on iTunes, SoundCloud, with clips posted to Witton's YouTube channel. They sometimes invited guests to their podcast. The chosen books included themes related to sex, relationships, and feminism. The podcast ended in January 2019.

Witton started her second YouTube channel, "More Hannah", at the end of 2019 to post lifestyle and productivity content. Her main channel featured series like 'The Hormone Diaries', where she documented her fertility journey in trying to conceive.

On 5 December 2023, Witton posted a video on her main channel announcing she was going to quit producing sex education content. She has continued to post lifestyle content on her second channel and runs a consultancy and project management business providing support to other content creators.

=== Writing ===
Pornography Addiction 101

Witton's first book, Doing It!: Let's Talk About Sex, was released on 6 April 2017 in Europe and in America on 3 July 2018. The book concentrates on sex and relationships including personal experiences, and won a SitC 2017 award. In 2019, Untendrumherumreden, the German translation, was published.

Her second book, The Hormone Diaries: The Bloody Truth About Our Periods, covering experiences of menstruation and education around it, was released in June 2019.

=== Podcast ===
In May 2019, Witton launched a podcast Doing It with Hannah Witton focusing on sex, relationships, taboos and our bodies. The podcast followed an interview format where Witton invited a guest to talk about a topic where they have expertise, in conversation. The podcast was distributed by Global, and was nominated in the podcast category in the 2020 Global Awards. It ended in December 2023.

=== TV and radio ===
Witton presented the ITV2 sex and relationships show Love Fix in February 2016.

Witton was a guest presenter for BBC Radio 5 Live on issues to do with sex and relationships, and has been a guest on various BBC radio talk segments on many occasions. Witton had a weekly radio show The Hannah Witton Show and co-presented an episode of The Calum McSwiggan Show on internet radio station Fubar Radio, and has presented the BBC Radio 1 segment The Internet Takeover.

== Personal life ==
After a bad flare of ulcerative colitis, Witton underwent an ileostomy in January 2018. In December she was a panelist in the "Sex and Science" discussion for the Yogscast Jingle Jam charity.

Witton married Daniel Leadley, older brother of fellow YouTuber and singer-songwriter Bethan Leadley, in September 2020. Witton gave birth to their first child on 30 April 2022. Witton announced her second pregnancy in July 2026 after struggling with infertility.

In 2022, Witton became a German citizen, in addition to her British citizenship.

== Bibliography ==
- Doing It: Let's Talk About Sex... (Wren & Rook 2017, ISBN 978-1-5263-6003-8)
- The Hormone Diaries: The Bloody Truth About Our Periods (Wren & Rook 2019, ISBN 978-1-5263-6146-2)

== See also ==
- List of YouTubers
- Rose and Rosie
