= Girl Online: On Tour =

2015 book by Zoe Sugg

- UK first edition
- Author: Zoe Sugg
- Audio read by: Hannah Tointon
- Language: English
- Series: Girl Online
- Genre: Romance / Drama
- Published: 2015 (Penguin)
- Publication place: England
- Media type: Print (Hardback) & eBook
- ISBN: 978-0-1413-5995-3
- OCLC: 927288550
- Preceded by: Girl Online
- Followed by: Girl Online: Going Solo

Girl Online: On Tour is the second novel by English author and YouTuber Zoe Sugg, released on 20 October 2015 through Penguin Books. The book is the second in the Girl Online series and is set six months after the original novel, Girl Online. The romance and drama novel is aimed at a young adult audience and focuses on a teenage girl, Penny, and the events as she joins her musician boyfriend on tour.

== Plot ==
The novel takes place six months after the first book and surrounds Penny Porter, an ex-blogger who is dating up-and-coming rock star Noah Flynn as he goes on a world tour supporting a new boy band. Penny joins him for the European leg of the tour and finds touring isn't quite as glamorous as she imagined.

== Publication history ==
Girl Online was released on 20 October 2015 through Penguin Books and the audiobook was released on 20 November 2015 through Audible.com. Before its release the novel was expected to be a success; tickets to the book-signing tour sold out in five minutes.

=== Publication ===
- Hardback, 20 Oct 2015
  - UK: Penguin Books ISBN 978-0-1413-5995-3
  - USA: Atria ISBN 978-1-5011-0033-8
- Audiobook, 20 Nov 2015, Audible
- Paperback, 14 July 2016
  - UK: Penguin Books ISBN 978-0-1413-6422-3
  - USA: Atria ISBN 978-1-5011-0034-5

== Reception ==
The novel was relatively well received, with most reviewers comparing the novel favourably to her debut. In a review for The Daily Telegraph, Charlotte Runcie found Girl Online: On Tour to be more mature than the previous, finding that "elements of Sugg’s own experiences... shine through with greater authenticity here" and that while the plot is "painted in broad strokes", "the bubblegum schmaltz gives way to some enjoyable coming-of-age drama", rating the novel a three out of five. David Barnett, writing for The Independent, found that while the novel deals with complex themes its treatment of them is somewhat lighthearted, stating: "it pitches to be Judy Blume and comes off more like Enid Blyton".

== Sequel ==
Girl Online: Going Solo, the third novel in the series, was published in hardback on 17 November 2016.
