= Villains (Emma Blackery album) =

Studio album by Emma Blackery
- Released: 31 August 2018
- Genre: Electropop
- Length: 39:30
- Label: RWG
- Producer: Emma Blackery; Hutch; Toby Scott

Emma Blackery chronology
| Magnetised (2017) | Villains (2018) | Girl in a Box (2021) |

Singles from Villains
- 1. "Dirt" Released: 16 March 2018; 2. "Agenda" Released: 4 May 2018; 3. "Icarus" Released: 22 June 2018; 4. "Take Me Out" Released: 10 August 2018

Villains is the debut studio album by English YouTuber and musician Emma Blackery. It was released on 31 August 2018 by RWG Records. After releasing independently five extended plays and gaining attention from Apple Inc.'s reveal of the iPhone X when one of her songs was used in the reveal, Blackery began writing for her debut album in September 2017. Villains is an electropop record whose recurring theme is Blackery's distrust within her social circle. She documented its recording process on her YouTube channel. Blackery worked with producers Peter Hutchings and Toby Scott among others.

Villains garnered a positive response from music critics, who complimented its sound. Commercially, the album peaked within the top thirty in Scotland and the United Kingdom and the top twenty on Billboard's Heatseekers Albums chart. The album was preceded by four singles–"Dirt", "Agenda", "Icarus" and "Take Me Out"–the first of which reached number 47 on the Official Charts Company's (OCC) Official Singles Sales chart. To promote the album, Blackery did live signings for it at HMV stores in the United Kingdom and also embarked on a European supporting tour in October 2018. On 31 August 2020, an acoustic reworking of the album was released.

== Background and release ==
Blackery (born 1991) played in local bands since she was 18 until she decided to pursue a solo career in 2012, when she also opened her YouTube channel. She posted a variety of things such as original songs and comedy skits. Prior to releasing her debut album, Blackery released independently five extended plays; Human Behaviour (2012), Distance (2013), Perfect (2013), Sucks to Be You (2015) and Magnetised (2017). The cover artwork of Magnetised, as well as its song of the same, were used during Apple Inc.'s reveal of the iPhone X in September 2017. Following the event, Blackery's manager stated that she gained attention from certain media as well as "renewed interest" from record labels he talked to previously. In the same month, she revealed that she began working on her debut album.

Blackery was set to embark on the Emma Blackery European Tour in March 2018, however it was postponed due to delays regarding the album's recording. On 22 May, Blackery unveiled the album's title alongside its cover artwork, track listing and release date (31 August) on her Twitter account. During the summer of the same year, Blackery documented the recording process of the album on her YouTube channel. Villains was released on 31 August 2018 through RWG Records for digital download and streaming. On the same day it was issued for CD, cassette and vinyl. The vinyl release of the record contains dedications to certain individuals. Blackery told The Echo that she "toyed with the idea of releasing the album years ago". On 31 August 2020, an acoustic reworking of the album was released.

== Music and lyrics ==
Villains is an electropop album. Leigh Sanders of Express & Star opined that Blackery "help[s] carry the mantra" of power pop with it while Sussex Express considered the record to be "a continuation of [Blackery's] departure from her earlier pop-rock sound, moving towards a pop-synth ambience straight out of the 1980s". Regarding the album's title, Blackery stated that it is "meant to be over the top, the people I'd fallen out with, they were villains, they were enemies now. It represents all that". In an August 2018 interview with HMV, Blackery declared that the she "wanted to channel all [her] emotions into [the album]" and that "every song handles the idea of friends dropping you or twisting things that you've said, especially in the public eye". She clarified that Villains is "very extreme, it goes from extreme anger to extreme introspection and in the end, not liking the person you're becoming". She co-wrote every track on the album, and also collaborated with producers Toby Scott and Peter Hutchings.

The record begins with "Villains Pt. 1" in which "the fake friends and jealous onlookers" are placed "as the eponymous villains", as stated by Sussex Express. Blackery wrote it in 2016 on a beatmaking application on her phone. "Dirt" is about Twitter "drama" between Blackery and a former friend of hers. Blackery stated that "everyone" claimed she was trying to be like Taylor Swift as she started writing the song two weeks before Swift released "Look What You Made Me Do" (2017). "Agenda" is about self-love and confidence. Sanders stated that the song contains "echoes of Daphne & Celeste". He further declared that the chorus of "Fake Friends" has "big synths" and "invasive percussion". In "Icarus", Blackery details her flaws and regrets of public experiences. She asserted that "Take Me Out" covers "feelings of paranoia and isolation" after being betrayed by someone. "Third Eye" begins with a "dancefloor intro" according to Sanders, who likened it to Stardust's "Music Sounds Better with You" (1998). Blackery considers "Burn the Witch" to be "Dirt"'s sister track since "it tells the story of finally overcoming the hurt [she] felt, and making one final purge of negativity". In "Villains Pt. 2", she ponders over her own part in her downfall, with Sussex Express calling it "an interesting counterpoint to the similarly named opening track". Blackery has stated that the aforementioned track is "the most personal song [she has] ever written" as it discusses the topic of mental health and "things [she has] gone through" as well as "mistakes [she has] made".

== Reception ==
Villains garnered a positive response from music critics. Sanders gave the record a 6/10 rating, calling it "a mixture of sounds from our pop worlds past" and "a solid welcoming", further adding that Blackery "[is] not here to make music-by-numbers". Sussex Express favourably compared the opening track to Lorde, "Dirt" to Tove Styrke and Dua Lipa and "Agenda" to Paramore's After Laughter (2017). The Argus affirmed that Blackery speaking "so honestly and openly about her struggles over the last year", made the album to be "gritty, hard-hitting, pop-fuelled". Midweek predictions suggested that the album would debut at number 15 on the UK Albums Chart, however it instead debuted with 3,098 copies and peaked at number 24. It further achieved peak positions of 18 and 21 on Billboard's Heatseekers Albums chart and in Scotland, respectively.

== Singles and promotion ==
"Dirt" served as the lead single off Villains, being released on 16 March 2018. It peaked at number 47 on the Official Singles Sales chart published by the Official Charts Company (OCC). "Agenda" and "Icarus" followed as the next singles in May and June, respectively. The fourth and last single off the album was "Take Me Out", which was issued on 10 August 2018. During the first week of September, Blackery performed live and signed copies of Villains at various HMV stores in the United Kingdom.

=== Europe Villains Tour ===
Europe Villains Tour
- Tour by Emma Blackery
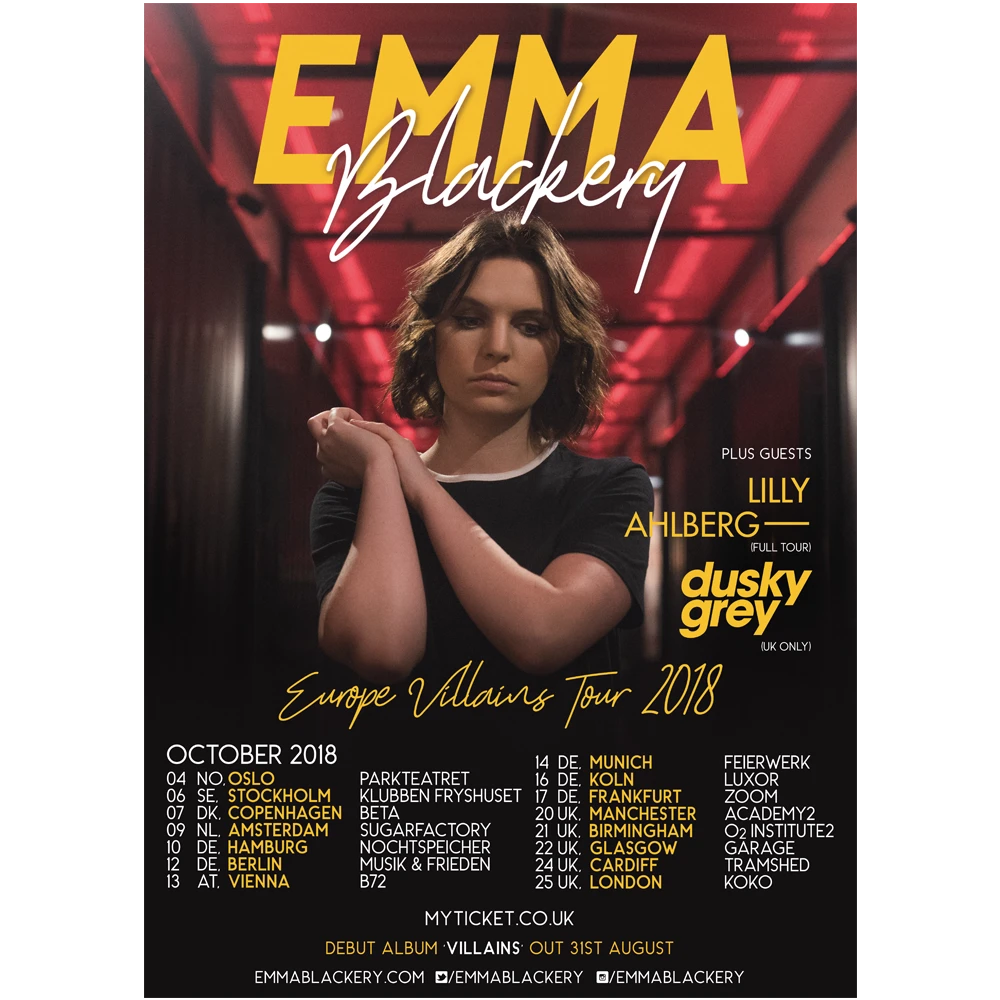
- Associated album: Villains
- Start date: 4 October 2018
- End date: 25 October 2018
- No. of shows: 15

Emma Blackery concert chronology
- Emma Blackery (2016); Europe Villains Tour (2018); Girl in a Box Tour (2021)

The Europe Villains Tour was the supporting concert tour for the album. Blackery announced it on her Twitter account on 23 April 2018, being titled Europe Album Tour at the time. It began at Oslo's Parkteatret on 4 October, followed by performances in other countries. The tour finished on 25 October, at London's KOKO.

List of concerts, showing date, city, country, venue, and opening act(s)
| Date (2018) | City | Country | Venue | Opening act(s) |
|---|---|---|---|---|
| 4 October | Oslo | Norway | Parkteatret | Lilly Ahlberg |
| 6 October (Note: The concert on 6 October 2018, in Stockholm, Sweden at Klubben Fryshuset, was originally set to take place at Bar Brooklyn, but was changed for unknown reasons.) | Stockholm | Sweden | Klubben Fryshuset | Lilly Ahlberg |
| 7 October | Copenhagen | Denmark | Beta | Lilly Ahlberg |
| 9 October | Amsterdam | Netherlands | Sugarfactory | Lilly Ahlberg |
| 10 October | Hamburg | Germany | Nochtspeicher | Lilly Ahlberg |
| 12 October | Berlin | Germany | Musik & Frieden | Lilly Ahlberg |
| 13 October | Vienna | Austria | B72 | Lilly Ahlberg |
| 14 October | Munich | Germany | Freierwerk | Lilly Ahlberg |
| 16 October | Cologne | Germany | Luxor | Lilly Ahlberg |
| 17 October | Frankfurt | Germany | Zoom | Lilly Ahlberg |
| 20 October | Manchester | United Kingdom | Manchester Academy 2 | Lilly Ahlberg; Dusky Grey |
| 21 October | Birmingham | United Kingdom | O2 Institute | Lilly Ahlberg; Dusky Grey |
| 22 October | Glasgow | United Kingdom | The Garage | Lilly Ahlberg; Dusky Grey |
| 24 October | Cardiff | United Kingdom | Tramshed | Lilly Ahlberg; Dusky Grey |
| 25 October | London | United Kingdom | KOKO | Lilly Ahlberg; Dusky Grey |

== Track listing ==
Credits adapted from Tidal.

| No. | Title | Writer(s) | Producer(s) | Length |
|---|---|---|---|---|
| 1. | "Villains Pt. 1" | Emma Blackery | Blackery; Hutch; Iain Mahanty^{[a]} | 3:37 |
| 2. | "Dirt" | Blackery; Toby Scott | Blackery; Scott | 3:18 |
| 3. | "Agenda" | Blackery; Scott | Blackery; Scott | 3:16 |
| 4. | "Fake Friends" | Blackery; Scott | Blackery; Scott | 3:36 |
| 5. | "Icarus" | Blackery; Scott | Blackery; Scott | 3:36 |
| 6. | "Take Me Out" | Blackery; Scott | Blackery; Scott | 3:06 |
| 7. | "Petty" | Blackery; Scott | Blackery; Scott | 2:48 |
| 8. | "Third Eye" | Blackery; Maxwell Cooke | Blackery; Hutch; Cooke^{[a]} | 4:24 |
| 9. | "What I Felt with You" | Blackery; Scott | Blackery; Scott | 3:52 |
| 10. | "Burn the Witch" | Blackery; Scott | Blackery; Scott | 3:11 |
| 11. | "Villains Pt. 2" | Blackery; Peter Hutchings | Blackery; Hutch | 4:47 |
| Total length: | | | | 39:30 |

=== Notes ===
- ^a signifies original producer

== Personnel ==
Credits adapted from the liner notes of Villains.

- Toby Scott – production (tracks 2–7, 9, 10), mixing, vocal production, keyboards, programming
- Hutch – production (tracks 1, 8, 11)
- Dick Beetham – mastering
- Iain Mahanty – original production (track 1)
- Maxwell Cooke – original production (track 8)
- Emma Blackery – guitar, keyboards, production^{[a]}
- Andy Robinson – additional guitar (tracks 3, 7, 10)

=== Notes ===
- ^a Blackery was not initially credited as producer on Villains, but this has since been updated

== Charts ==
Chart performance for Villains
| Chart (2018) | Peak position |
|---|---|
| Scottish Albums (OCC) | 21 |
| UK Albums (OCC) | 24 |
| UK Independent Albums (OCC) | 6 |
| US Heatseekers Albums (Billboard) | 18 |

== Release history ==
Release dates and formats for Villains
| Region | Date | Label | Format(s) | Ref. |
|---|---|---|---|---|
| Various | 31 August 2018 | RWG | Digital download; streaming | |
| Various | 31 August 2018 | N/A | CD; cassette; vinyl | |
