= Laura Brouwers (artist) =

Dutch illustrator (born 1995)

- Born: 18 June 1995 (age 31)
- Known for: Character design; portrait; digital art; illustration; watercolour

Laura Brouwers (born 18 June 1995), also known by her pseudonym Cyarin or Cyarine, is a Dutch digital artist and illustrator.

== Background ==
Brouwers is from Eindhoven. She has a younger sister. Brouwers was diagnosed with Asperger syndrome at a young age. She attended both a mainstream school and a special education school, and ended up leaving school early to move into an assisted living project. As of 2017, she was living in her own house in Strijp. Brouwers is bisexual.

== Career ==
After beginning her online art journey in a private Hyves group, Brouwers joined DeviantArt in 2009, and created her YouTube channel Cyarin and began uploading illustration videos in 2012. On Instagram, she reached 100 thousand followers in 2015, and 1 million in 2017. Brouwers held her first in-person exhibition in collaboration with HP Nederland at the Muntgebouw Utrecht in January 2017.

In 2018, Brouwers published her debut book Expedition Sketchbook (Dutch: Expeditie schetsboek via Kosmos Uitgevers. That same year, she appeared on a Disability Panel at Summer in the City. Brouwers has collaborated with and provided artwork for the likes of YouTuber Phil Lester and singer-songwriter Leadley on merchandise and cover art respectively, and worked with companies such as Mojang, Adobe, Discord, Wacom, and Lego. Brouwers spoke at The Art Department 2022 in Eindhoven and Berlin.

In mid 2023 Cyarin stopped posting on social media for reasons unknown. As of November 2026, she has not returned to social media.

== Art style ==
Brouwers is best known for her character design and portraits, be it of friends, public figures such as Safiya Nygaard, and fans who request it. When promoting her Expedition Sketchbook, her style was described as a "mix of manga and pin-up with Disney influences". She is primarily a digital illustrator who takes inspiration and aesthetics from traditional media, such as ink and watercolours and transposes them digitally. Her username is a portmanteau of cyan and aquamarine.

== Bibliography ==
- Expedition Sketchbook: Inspiration and Skills for Your Artistic Journey (Dutch: Expeditie schetsboek. Inspiratie en oefeningen van tekenaar tot tekenaar) (2018)
