= Over the Rainbow (organization) =

Over The Rainbow (Traditional Chinese: 站出彩虹) is a non-profit organization in Hong Kong established by Anthony Man Ho Fung and a small group registered social workers in 1998. They aimed at supporting families of lesbian and gay in Hong Kong which is aligned to the one of PFLAG. Over The Rainbow is the first organization of its kind in South East Asia.

In the past few years, Over The Rainbow held various types activities like seminar, interview, workshop. In 2003 and 2005, it had organized a debate event with The Family Planning Association of Hong Kong and provided articles for the sex education website of the association.
