= Connie Glynn =

British voice actor, YouTuber, author

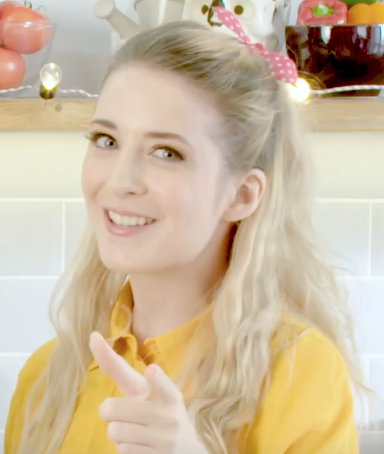
- Glynn in 2019
- Born: Constance Ella Glynn; 16 March 1994 (age 32); Hatfield, Hertfordshire, England
- Education: University of Sussex (BA)
- Occupations: YouTuber; Author

YouTube information
- Channel: Connie Glynn
- Years active: 2013–present
- Subscribers: 801 thousand
- Views: 18.802 million
- Last updated: April 8, 2026

Constance Ella Glynn (born 16 March 1994) is an English author, Internet personality, musician and former cosplayer. Glynn gained prominence on YouTube and has since become known for writing young adult fiction.

== Early life ==
Glynn is from Hatfield, Hertfordshire. She (Note: Glynn uses she/her and they/them pronouns. This article uses she/her pronouns for consistency.) and her brother attended St. Christopher School in Letchworth on a bursary. She took classes at Guildhall School of Music & Drama as a teenager. After graduating from the University of Sussex with a Bachelor of Arts in Film Studies in 2016, Glynn moved to London.

== Career ==
Glynn started the Noodlerella blog on Tumblr, where she would post about Disney, anime, and video games. This translated into her YouTube channel, where she uploaded her first video doing Disney impressions in January 2013. She became known on the Internet for her pink-loving "Noodlerella" persona and fashion sense, impressions, and love of cartoons and Disney, and cosplay. In 2016, Glynn started a second channel, originally named NoodleVlogs and later Connie.

Glynn voiced the role of Moxie Dewdrop in the UK edition of the 2016 DreamWorks film Trolls.

In 2017, Glynn signed a three-book deal with the aim of five books with Penguin Random House for a young adult fairytale series The Rosewood Chronicles largely based on Glynn's own experiences at boarding school. The first installment in the series, Undercover Princess made her the top debut author in the young adult genre in the UK in 2017. Undercover Princess was followed by Princess-in-Practice and The Lost Princess in 2018 and 2019 respectively. With these came book tours.

In 2018, Glynn moved away from her Noodlerella persona, and in August 2019, she rebranded away from "the colour pink" as part of her identity and aesthetic as she decided to focus more on writing and music with her band Snaggletooth.

Glynn revealed the cover for Princess at Heart in October 2020, the fourth book in The Rosewood Chronicles series. It was released in February 2021. Glynn announced the title for the series' fifth and final installment, Princess Ever After in July 2021, for a February 2022 release date.

Glynn reunited with Penguin for her next young adult fantasy book trilogy, starting with The Cursed Melodies.

== Personal life ==
Glynn is bisexual and confirmed she has a boyfriend in 2024, having been open about her journey with various different labels. Glynn uses both they and she pronouns.

Glynn was hit by a car in November 2016 and broke her leg. She had surgery twice. In May 2019, she opened up about the PTSD and subsequent agoraphobia and paranoia she experienced in the years following the accident.

== Bibliography ==
=== The Rosewood Chronicles ===
- Undercover Princess (2017)
- Princess in Practice (2018)
- The Lost Princess (2019)
- Princess at Heart (2021)
- Princess Ever After (2022)

=== Tales from the Shadow Library ===
- The Cursed Melodies (2025)
- The Darkest Duet (2026)

== Awards and nominations ==
Year	Award	Category	Work	Result	Ref.
2016	Kids' Choice Awards	UK Favourite Breakthrough Vlogger	Herself	Nominated	
2016	Summer in the City Awards	Breakthrough Award	Herself	Nominated	
2018	Summer in the City Awards	Book of the Year	Undercover Princess	Nominated	
