= Malena Nunes =

Brazilian YouTuber and online streamer

malena010102
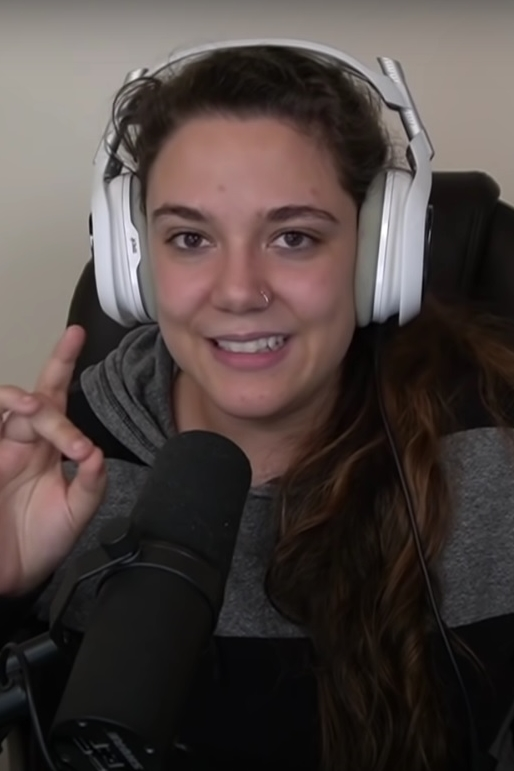
- Nunes in 2020
- Born: 2 February 1995 (age 31); São Paulo, State of São Paulo, Brazil
- Occupations: YouTube personality; online streamer; digital influencer

YouTube information
- Channel: malena010102
- Years active: 2012–present
- Subscribers: 6 million
- Views: 1.09 billion
- Last updated: 4 August 2026

Malena Riskevich Nunes (born 2 February 1995), also known as Malena0202 and Malena010102, is a Brazilian YouTuber, online streamer and digital influencer. She is known for her gameplay videos. She was one of the pioneers in gameplay content on YouTube. In 2017, she owned one of the largest video game channels run by a woman in Brazil.

In 2016, she released her first and only book, titled "Fala aí, Malena! - O Livro dos Bunitos" (Speak up, Malena! - The Book of Cute People).

== Biography ==
Nunes was born on 2 February 1995. Daughter of Ana Maria Riskevich Nunes, she began her career on YouTube at age 17. She became interested in games because of her mother, Ana Maria.

Nunes studied Radio & TV, however, the success of her channel made her drop out of college to dedicate herself exclusively to YouTube. She launched her book, Fala aí, Malena! - O Livro dos Bunitos, in 2016. On September 15, 2017, she was invited to Rock in Rio VII to be on the Digital Stage (the area where invited YouTubers are at the festival).

== Personal life ==
In August 2020, in a video, she reported going through problems in her personal life, in which she cried and apologized for not being able to work as she would like. In an interview, Nunes mentioned that she suffered prejudice because of her appearance in childhood.

Nunes is a lesbian.
