= Emma Blackery =

British musician (born 1991)

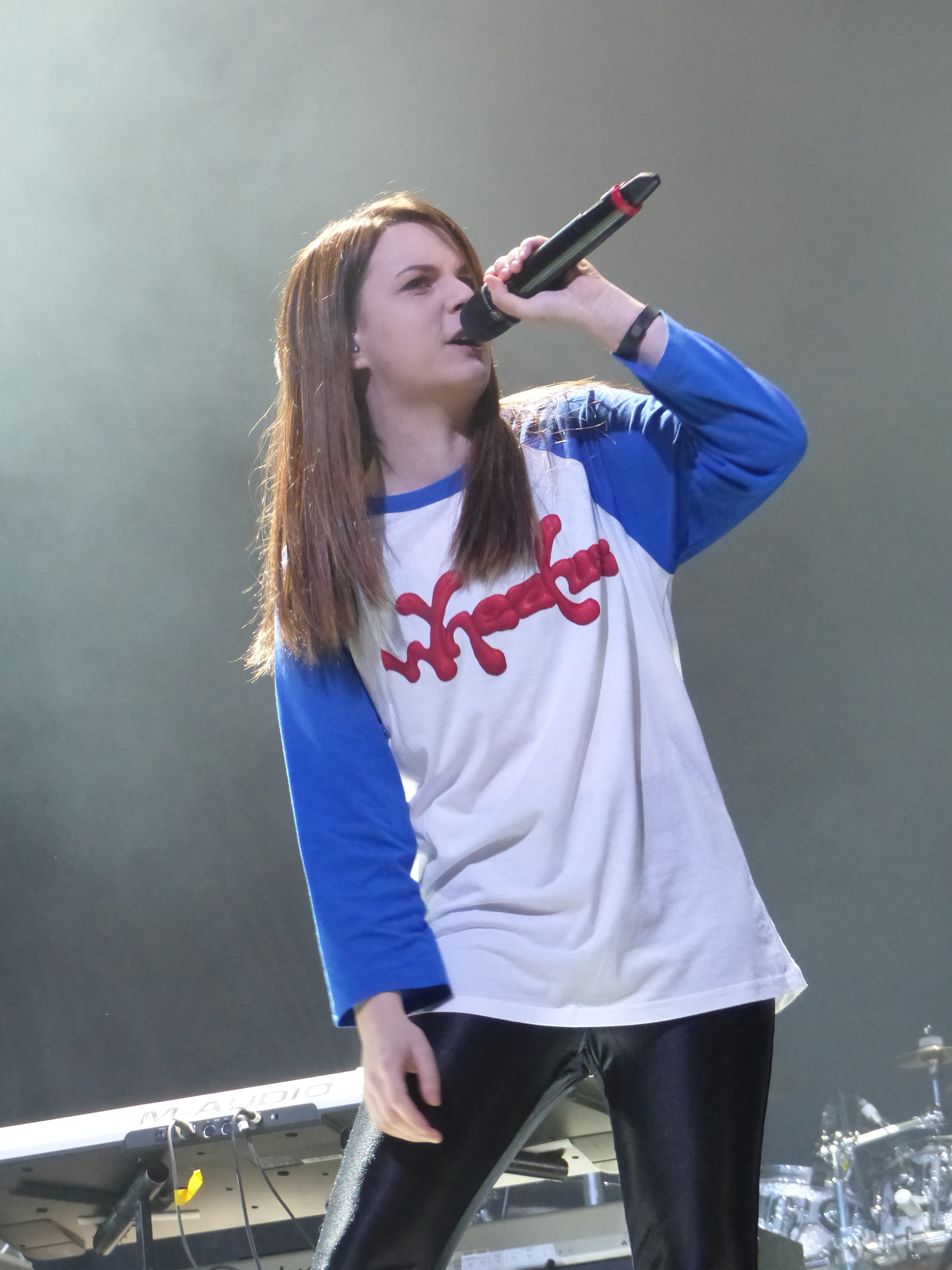
- Blackery at the Manchester Arena in 2016

Background information
- Born: Emma Louise Blackery; 11 November 1991 (age 35); Basildon, Essex, England
- Origin: Basildon
- Genres: Pop; pop rock; synth-pop; pop-punk
- Instruments: Vocals; guitar; ukulele
- Years active: 2012–present
- Labels: AntiFragile; RWG
- Website: official website

Twitch information
- Channel: emmablackerytv
- Genres: Music; comedy; gaming; vlogging
- Followers: 6.0 thousand

YouTube information
- Channel: emmablackery
- Genres: Music; comedy; health; vlogs
- Subscribers: 1.21 million
- Views: 148 million
- Last updated: 19 June 2026

Emma Louise Blackery (born 11 November 1991) is an English singer-songwriter, YouTuber, Twitch streamer, and author. Active since 2012, Blackery has garnered over a million subscribers on her YouTube channel and released two studio albums and six EPs. She has toured with Busted, and headlined tours for her debut studio album Villains, released on her RWG Records label in 2018.

In 2025, Blackery's main YouTube channel had 1.22 million subscribers. She performed and was a panelist at YouTube events (including Summer in the City and VidCon), and has contributed twice to the YouTube Rewind video series. Blackery's book, Feel Good 101: The Outsiders' Guide to a Happier Life, is based on her 2013 Feel Good 101 video series.

As of 2025, amid a change of interest, and fears YouTube had become saturated, she focuses her efforts on her music and growing her Twitch channel, where twice weekly she streams 'Just Chatting', music, and gaming streams.

== Early life ==
Blackery grew up in Basildon, Essex, finishing sixth form at Bromfords School in Wickford. She was a waitress before beginning her career as a musician and YouTuber.

== Music career ==
=== Debut and early success (2012–2018) ===
Blackery released her debut demo-EP, Human Behaviour, in early 2012 exclusively on Bandcamp. The title track was later re-recorded for her 2017 EP Magnetised along with other demos released by Blackery at that time. Her first official EP, Distance came out in July 2013 and spawned the music video for the lead track, "Go the Distance", produced by Arthur Walwin. Her second EP, Perfect, was released on 11 November 2014. Its title track topped the UK Independent Singles Breakers Chart for one week, and entered the UK Rock & Metal Singles Chart at number eight. In 2015, Elle included Blackery on its "30 Women Under 30 Who Are Changing the World" list.

Jason Perry produced Blackery's fourth EP, Sucks to Be You, which was released in 2016. Its title track peaked at number 85 on the Scottish Singles Chart. On 4 April 2016, Blackery announced that she would join pop punk band Busted on their Pigs Can Fly tour. "Sucks to Be You" was the runner-up for the first Summer in the City Song of the Year award. After touring with Busted, Blackery toured on her own and performed her music at other YouTube events.

She released her fifth EP, Magnetised, on 26 May 2017. It spent one week on the UK Albums Chart at number 63, and peaked at number five on the UK Independent Albums Chart and number two on the Official Independent Album Breakers Chart. On 6 August, Blackery received a Summer in the City Song of the Year award for "Nothing Without You". The cover art for Magnetised was featured at the Apple Keynote event for the iPhone X in September 2017.

=== Villains (2018–2020) ===
Blackery founded her independent record label, RWG Records, in 2018 and began work on her debut studio album Villains. She has explained that releasing on her own label gives her "control over a lot more aspects of [her] music career." On 16 March 2018, she released the lead single "Dirt", produced by Toby Scott. The song, on Spotify's New Music Friday UK playlist, was described by Record of the Day as a "slick combination of Scandi-pop" and "sassy American pop"; Blackery described "Dirt" as "best served cold". On 3 May 2018 she released her second single "Agenda" along with a lyric video. On 22 May 2018 she released the music video for "Agenda" followed by a lyric video for "Icarus" and a music video for "Take Me Out" in June and August respectively.

Blackery shared that during the album's creation, she learned more about production and the artistic direction she wanted to go in. She explained, "It was really during the album writing process that [she] learned how to create music outside of basic chords on a guitar - [she] ended up producing a large amount of the finished product that [her] fans heard and only learned after it was released that sometimes you sadly have to fight for credit on your own work." In retrospect, she also admits she would revisit the choruses on "Fake Friends" and "Take Me Out," saying she wouldn't make them as "simplistic" if she made the songs more recently.

Villains was released on 31 August 2018. The album contains songs written in collaboration with Toby Scott, Maxwell Cooke, and Peter Hutchings. BroadwayWorld noted that "Petty" "flirts with tropical house", and the Express & Star cited elements of power pop. Lisa Hafey, praising "Third Eye"'s "upbeat disco sound" and "nice ABBA-y vibe", called Villains "a bit of a feminist album". In June Blackery performed "Third Eye" live at the 9th VidCon Night of Awesome. Blackery then partnered with HMV for a UK tour. Villains spent one week on the UK Albums Chart at number 24 and number 18 on the Billboard Heatseekers Albums chart. Thomas Smith noted in an NME blog how Apple events helped Sofi Tukker, Emma Blackery, and Odesza in their careers.

The European Villains Tour, planned for March 2018, was postponed until October. London based singer-songwriter Lilly Ahlberg was the tour's special guest. The three-week tour began at Oslo's Parkteatret on 4 October, followed by performances in Stockholm, Copenhagen, Sugarfactory (Amsterdam), Hamburg, Berlin, Vienna, Munich, Cologne, Frankfurt, Academy 2 (Manchester), O_{2} Institute2 (Birmingham), The Garage (Glasgow), and Tramshed (Cardiff) before ending at KOKO in London on 25 October. A Never Enough Notes reviewer at KOKO saw "angst, passion, and energy in every word" and wrote that Blackery has "a knack for live shows; full of attitude, high energy and a phenomenal vocal performance".

Blackery released "Cute Without You", coproduced with Toby Scott, in April 2019, adapted from a demo she produced herself as part of a collaboration with Rimmel London the year prior. In July 2019, she performed at the Evoke festival in Brentwood and for BBC Radio 5 Live, where Nihal Arthanayake interviewed her for his Headliners series. In December 2019 she performed an unreleased song titled "Plot Holes" at SitC Winter Edition at the NEC.

=== Girl in a Box & Past & Present Tour (2020–present) ===
Blackery released her sixth EP, My Arms Are Open, on 15 May 2020. The lead single "Wolves' was released on 2 April 2020 ahead of the EP. She went on to release lyric videos for songs "Plot Holes" and "History of Touches". She has described them as "some really personal lyric videos", which she created herself both in her home studio and outside near her home at sunset. On 10 December 2020 Blackery released a standalone single titled "Blossom".

On 22 November 2020, Blackery announced during a YouTube video that her second studio album was in production, due to be released in 2021. On 9 June 2021, Blackery revealed her second album's title, Girl in a Box, through a series of tweets, where she posted the album's cover art, alongside the release date of 27 August 2021. These tweets include the full tracklist, revealing a total of ten songs, which includes the previously released singles "Crying", "Brutus" and "My Terms", as well as the announcement of a UK tour to promote the album, which was scheduled for February 2022. She released two singles after the album called "What Have You Done for Me Lately?" and "Cry to Your Mother" leading into the tour. She had to reschedule for June 2022 for COVID-19 reasons.

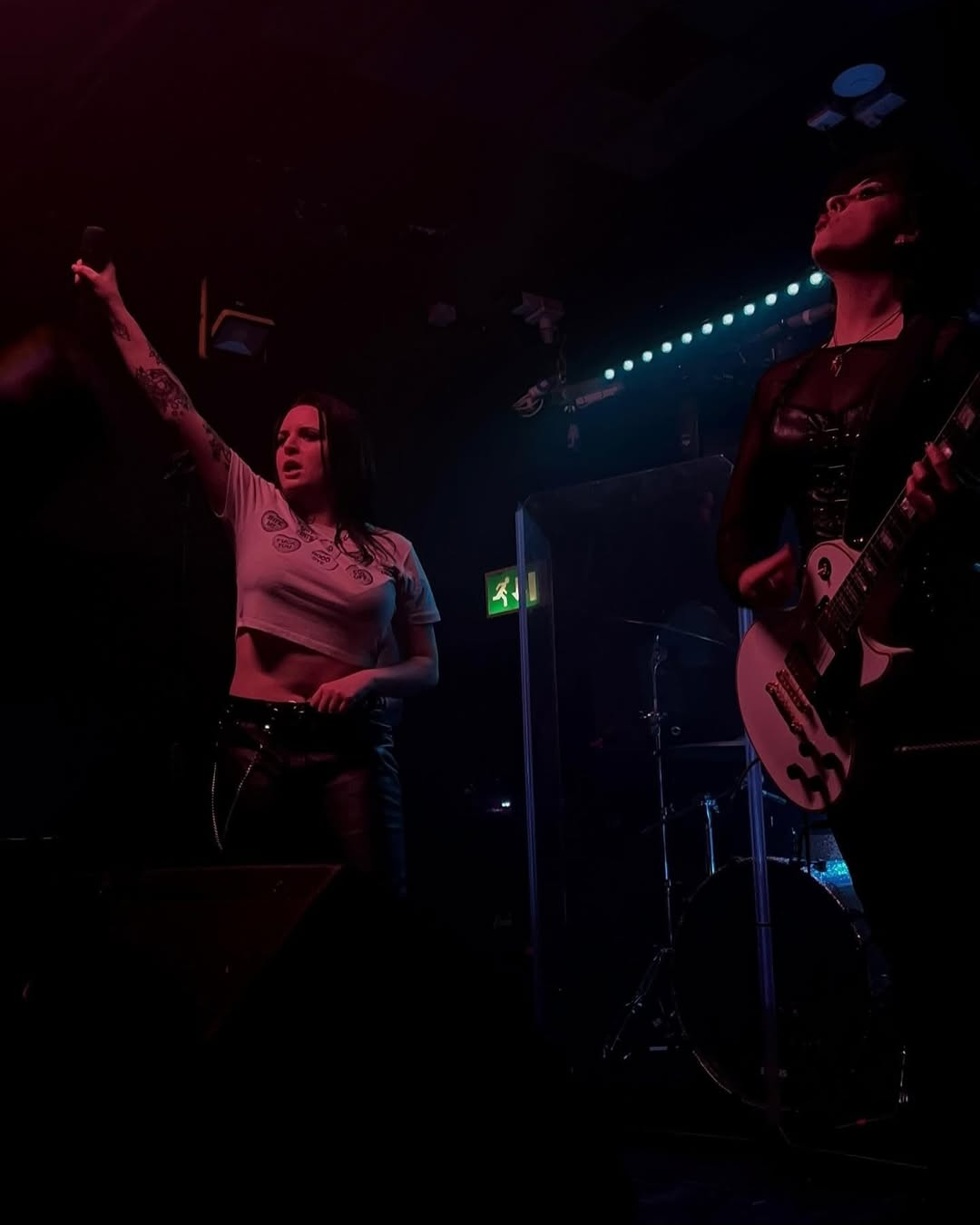
Blackery on her "Past & Present" tour in 2024 (left)

In January 2023, she announced she was working on a new EP to be released later in the year. "Everybody Lies" came out in July 2023 as the lead single, while "Apologise" and "Parasite" came out prior the Cannot Help Myself EP's release in October 2023.

In December 2023, Blackery announced her Past & Present Tour taking place in October 2024 through several venues in the United Kingdom. She recheduled the tour in September 2024 for October 2024, It continued in February 2025, however was soon cancelled before the Kings Heath show at the Hare and Hounds pub, due to urgent family matters.

In 2024, Blackery released singles; "Drop Dead Disco" on 19 July, "Fantasy" on 13 September, and "All The Way Down" on 15 November, and in 2025, released "Isn't It Funny" on 7 February, "NEPO BABY" on 6 June, "USED' September 26. She then went onto to release "Right Times", "She's THAT", "Goldfish" and "Shame" in 2026.

== Other work ==
=== YouTube ===
Blackery was initially inspired by Shane Dawson, Smosh, Dan Howell, Phil Lester and, in 2017, by Troye Sivan. In 2018, Blackery had three active YouTube channels; other channels have been deleted, re-branded, or left inactive.

- Emma Blackery – Blackery's main channel, created in May 2012, on which she hosts vlogs, music videos, comedy sketches, and other content. Although she began to develop a following by reading excerpts from Fifty Shades of Grey on her channel, the videos were removed due to copyright complaints. In 2018, the channel had nearly 1.5 million subscribers.
- EmmaBlackeryVEVO – created to upload her Vevo music videos, including "Nothing Without You", "Magnetised", "Don't Come Home" (lyric video), "Dirt" (acoustic version), "Agenda" (lyric video), "Icarus" (lyric video), and Take Me Out.
- Vloggery – dedicated to vlogs, including her IPOAD series of longer videos and other content not on her main channel. Blackery presented Summer in the City 2017 in three videos. EmmaBlackeryVEVO, Vloggery, and the Topic channel have been closed to subscription since May 2019, and all videos are on the main channel.

In 2013, Blackery participated in YouTube's Geek Week, and Grace Helbig featured her in a Not Too Deep podcast the following year. She received a Gold Creator Award for having over one million subscribers in 2015, and joined PewDiePie's now-defunct Revelmode network, won on Tom Scott's Game On show, was spotlighted by YouTube as one of 18 #MadeForYou UK YouTubers, and appeared in the Red Bull TV documentary Kings of Content with Louis Cole the following year. She expressed her unhappiness with YouTube Rewind after two appearances, and The Guardian cited Blackery as one of three case studies of pressure and YouTube burnout in 2018. She since admitted that she "finally stopped chasing that next viral video and [that she's] comfortable making content for [herself]."

Some of her most-viewed videos are "If Tampon Commercials Were Honest", "The Sims in Real Life", and "If Websites Started Dating". Blackery's "My thoughts on Google+" video went viral in 2013, after Tubefilter featured it as the best reaction to a new YouTube comment system. Blackery sang it again in November 2018 to celebrate the end of Google+. In December 2016, TenEighty included her "YouTube Heros (Parody)" as one of their "Five of the Best: Parody Videos".

=== Twitch ===
As of 2025, alongside less frequent YouTube videos, Blackery focusses her efforts on her music releases and streams on Twitch. On the website, she frequently streams herself talking to viewers in chat, playing live music, or video games, typically Life is Strange and Peggle, and other requests. She typically streams twice a week, with updates on her social media platforms.

=== Writing ===
Blackery wrote Feel Good 101: The Outsiders' Guide to a Happier Life (based on her 2013 Feel Good 101 video series), addressing depression, self-harm, anxiety and other issues. The book was published in September 2017.

== Personal life ==
In 2015, Blackery disclosed that she had been diagnosed with chronic fatigue syndrome.

In February 2023, she announced her engagement to her partner Davey Bennett, guitarist of Pop Will Eat Itself.

== Discography ==
=== Albums ===
| Title | Peak chart position | | Release details |
| Title | UK | SCO | Release details |
|---|---|---|---|
| Villains | 24 | 21 | Released: 31 August 2018; Label: RWG Records; Formats: Streaming, Digital, CD, LP, cassette |
| Villains Acoustic Anniversary Edition | — | — | Released: 31 August 2020; Label: RWG Records; Formats: Streaming |
| Girl in a Box | — | — | Released: 27 August 2021; Label: AntiFragile Music; Formats: Streaming, Digital, CD, LP |

=== EPs ===
| Title | Peak chart position | Release details |
| Title | UK | Release details |
|---|---|---|
| Human Behaviour | — | Released: 17 May 2012; Label: Independent; Formats: Digital |
| Distance | — | Released: 16 July 2013; Label: Independent; Formats: Digital, CD, Streaming |
| Perfect | — | Released: 11 November 2014; Label: Independent; Formats: Digital, CD, Streaming |
| Sucks to Be You | — | Released: 27 May 2016; Label: Independent; Formats: Digital, CD, Streaming |
| Magnetised | 63 | Released: 26 May 2017; Label: Emma Blackery Ltd.; Formats: Digital, CD, LP, Streaming |
| My Arms Are Open | — | Released: 15 May 2020; Label: RWG Records; Formats: Digital, CD, Streaming |
| Cannot Help Myself | — | Released: 6 October 2023; Label: RWG Records; Formats: Digital, CD, Streaming |

=== Singles ===
| Title | Year | Peak chart positions | | Album |
| Title | Year | UK Sales | SCO | Album |
|---|---|---|---|---|
| "Go the Distance" | 2013 | — | — | Distance |
| "The Promise" | 2013 | — | — | Distance |
| "Perfect" | 2014 | 92 | — | Perfect |
| "Your Own Shoes" | 2015 | — | — | Non-album singles |
| "I've Been Worse" | 2015 | — | — | Non-album singles |
| "Sucks to Be You" | 2016 | 89 | 85 | Sucks to Be You |
| "Nothing Without You" | 2017 | — | — | Magnetised |
| "Magnetised" | 2017 | — | — | Magnetised |
| "Don't Come Home" | 2017 | — | — | Magnetised |
| "Dirt" | 2018 | 47 | 56 | Villains |
| "Dirt (acoustic)" | 2018 | — | — | Non-album single |
| "Agenda" | 2018 | — | — | Villains |
| "Icarus" | 2018 | — | — | Villains |
| "Take Me Out" | 2018 | — | — | Villains |
| "Cute Without You" | 2019 | — | — | Non-album single |
| "Wolves" | 2020 | 99 | 98 | My Arms Are Open |
| "Blossom" | 2020 | — | — | Non-album single |
| "Crying" | 2021 | — | — | Girl in a Box |
| "Brutus" | 2021 | — | — | Girl in a Box |
| "My Terms" | 2021 | — | — | Girl in a Box |
| "Shadowplay" | 2021 | — | — | Girl in a Box |
| "Ridicule" | 2021 | — | — | Girl in a Box |
| "Celebrity Skin" (with Bronnie) | 2022 | — | — | Non-album singles |
| "What Have You Done for Me Lately?" | 2022 | — | — | Non-album singles |
| "Cry to Your Mother" | 2022 | — | — | Non-album singles |
| "Everybody Lies" | 2023 | — | — | Cannot Help Myself |
| "Apologise" | 2023 | — | — | Cannot Help Myself |
| "Parasite" | 2023 | — | — | Cannot Help Myself |
| "Forever (candlelight version)" | 2023 | — | — | Non-album singles |
| "Drop Dead Disco" | 2024 | — | — | Non-album singles |
| "Fantasy" | 2024 | — | — | Non-album singles |
| "All The Way Down" | 2024 | — | — | Non-album singles |
| "Isn't It Funny" | 2025 | — | — | Non-album singles |
| "Nepo Baby" | 2025 | — | — | Non-album singles |
| "Nostalgia (with MILXNAKE)" | 2025 | — | — | Non-album singles |
| "USED" | 2025 | — | — | Non-album singles |
| "Right Times" | 2026 | — | — | Non-album singles |
| "She's THAT!" | 2026 | — | — | Non-album singles |
| "Goldfish" | 2026 | — | — | Non-album singles |
| "Shame" | 2026 | — | — | Non-album singles |

== Bibliography ==
- Feel Good 101: The Outsiders' Guide to a Happier Life (Sphere, 2017, ISBN 978-0751569230)

== See also ==
- List of YouTubers
- The Internet Takeover
- Dodie Clark
- Daniel Hardcastle
- Jacksepticeye
