= AsapScience =

YouTube channel

AsapSCIENCE
- AsapSCIENCE logo
- Genre: Education, science
- Language: English

Creative team
- Created by: Mitch Moffit; Gregory Brown

Cast and voices
- Hosted by: Mitch Moffit; Gregory Brown

Production
- Production: Sarah Weichel Management

Publication
- No. of episodes: 195
- Original release: June 6, 2012; 14 years ago
- Provider: YouTube

Related
- Related shows: Kurzgesagt
- Website: Official website; AsapScience's channel on YouTube

YouTube information
- Channel: AsapSCIENCE
- Subscribers: 10.8 million
- Views: 2 billion
- Last updated: September 24, 2025

AsapScience, stylized as AsapSCIENCE, is a YouTube channel created by Canadian YouTubers Mitchell Moffit and Gregory Brown. The channel produces a range of videos that touch on various concepts related to science and technology.

AsapScience is one of the largest educational channels on YouTube. The channel was created in May 2012 and had acquired more than 7 million subscribers by March 2018, and 10 million by 2025. In addition to videos explaining scientific news and research, the channel produces songs, several of which have achieved viral fame and also created controversy.

== Team ==
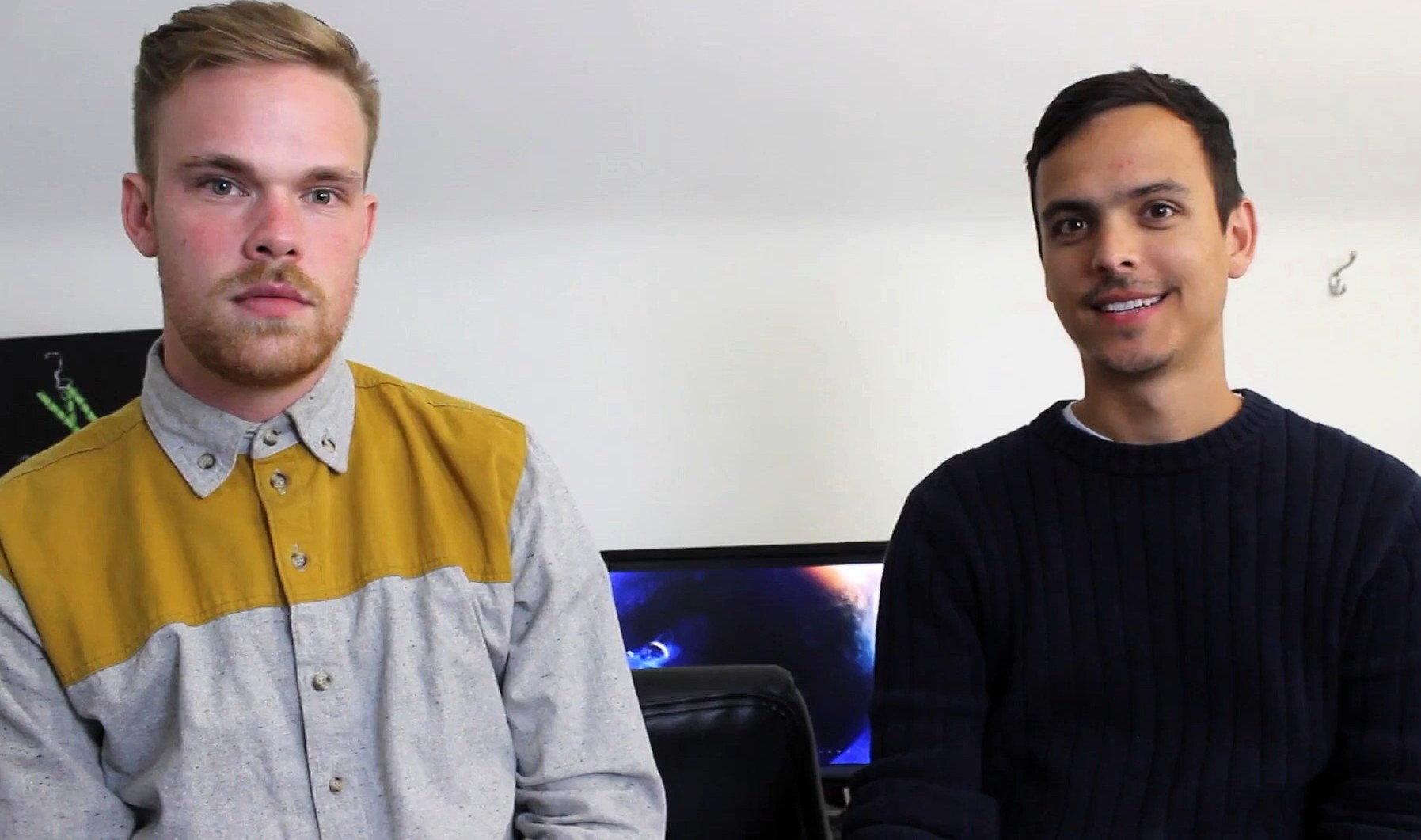
Greg Brown (left) and Mitch Moffit (right) in 2014

- Mitchell "Mitch" Moffit, born March 27, 1988 (age 38), creator and host
- Gregory "Greg" Brown, born September 25, 1988 (age 38), creator and host
- Kendra Y. Hill, manager
- Max Simmons, illustrator
- Luka Sarlija, editor

Moffit and Brown are an openly gay couple who met while studying biology at the University of Guelph. They made their relationship public online in 2014, two years after starting their channel, in response to derogatory comments and in order to be visible role models for young gay people interested in science.

Moffit and Brown have been praised for prompting meaningful dialogue about LGBTQ+ issues.

== Channel ==
AsapScience videos are about science, with many episodes, such as How Much Sleep Do You Actually Need?, discussing functions of the human body. They have produced songs about scientific concepts, such as Science Love Song, Periodic Table Song, and 100 Digits of Pi. Each video's scientific concepts are conveyed using coloured drawings on a whiteboard and voice-over narration in a stop motion format. As revealed in a behind-the-scenes video, Moffit voices and composes the background music for the videos, while Brown is the primary illustrator.

The most viewed video of the channel as of September 2024 is Do You Hear "Yanny" or "Laurel"?, which has 66 million views. Their videos have been featured in websites such as The Huffington Post and Gizmodo. In March 2015, Moffit and Brown released their first book, AsapSCIENCE: Answers to the World's Weirdest Questions, Most Persistent Rumors, and Unexplained Phenomena.

In 2018, Brown and Moffit started hosting a podcast titled Sidenote to accompany the channel.

=== Collaborations ===
AsapScience has collaborated with Jake Roper, known on YouTube as Vsauce3, in four videos: The Scientific Secret of Strength and Muscle Growth, What if Superman Punched You?, Can We Genetically Improve Intelligence? and Can You Genetically Enhance Yourself?. Another video, Could We Stop An Asteroid?, features Bill Nye, who discusses different ways humanity could stop an asteroid if one were on a collision course for Earth.

On February 2, 2014, AsapScience announced that they have collaborated with CBC News to produce one video daily related to sports, for 19 days starting from 6 February. AsapScience also appeared in several videos with IISuperwomanII. They had a one-time collaboration with Kurzgesagt on the What Is The Most Dangerous Drug In The World? video which aired on November 16, 2017.

In December 2017, AsapScience appeared on Rhett and Link's YouTube channel Good Mythical Morning. In 2020, alongside Psych IRL and others, AsapScience featured in a YouTube original series Sleeping With Friends, a competition in which participants aim to get the best night's sleep.

=== Statistics ===
As of 21 April 2025, AsapScience and Greg and Mitch have over 11 million subscribers combined.

	Subscribers	Views
AsapSCIENCE	10,700,000	1,992,481,580
Greg and Mitch	772,000	66,608,359
Total	11,472,000	2,059,089,939

== Other work ==
In February 2016, Moffit was announced as one of the 16 HouseGuests on Big Brother Canada 4. He placed 11th and was evicted on day 42 in a 5-3 eviction vote. He was the first member of the Final Jury that decided the winner of the game.

== Honours ==
On December 7, 2023, Mary Simon, the Governor General of Canada, invested both Brown and Moffit with the Meritorious Service Medal (Civil Division) for using "explanations, solid facts and humour" to "educate the Internet generation about science topics".

== See also ==
- Vsauce
- Veritasium
- MinutePhysics
- Numberphile
- Kurzgesagt
- Vi Hart
- Wendover Productions
- Mark Rober
