= PutoMikel =

Spanish archaeologist and YouTuber

Mikel Herrán
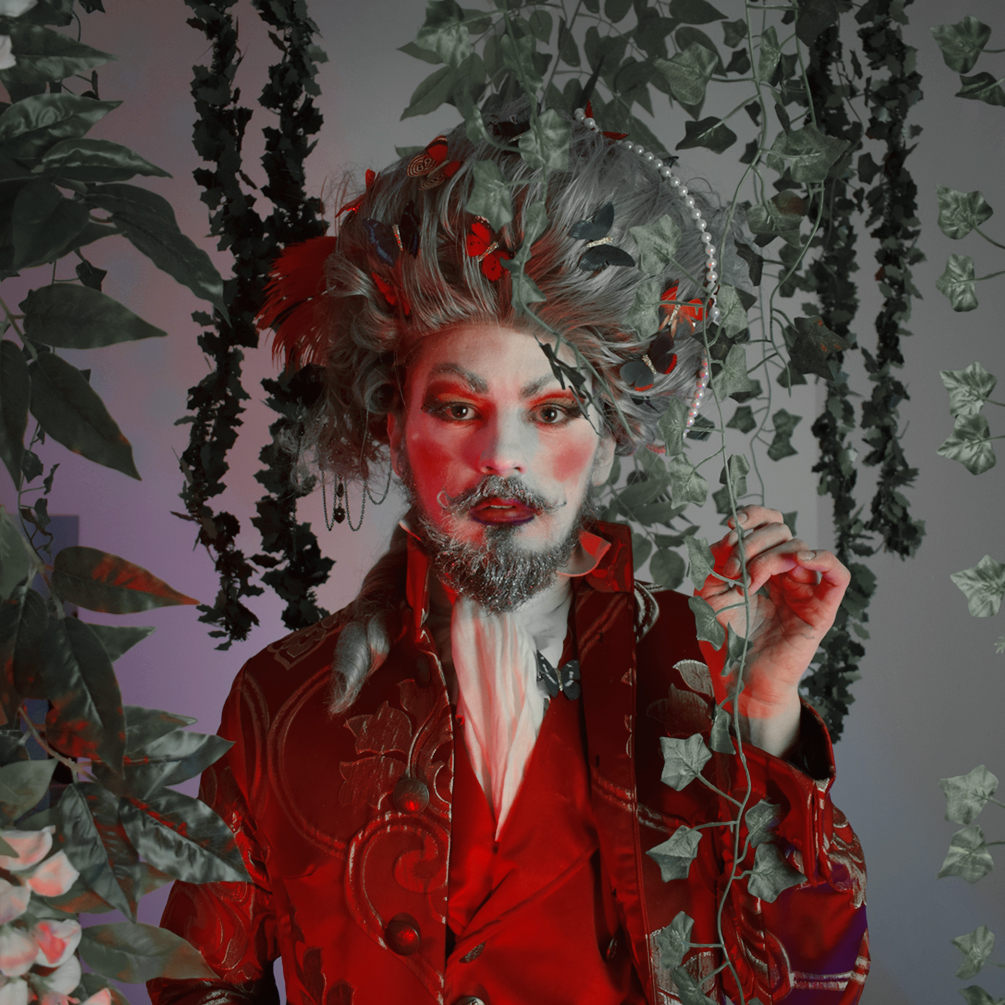
- Born: Mikel Herrán Subiñas; 1991 (age 33–34); Zaragoza, Spain
- Education: Complutense University of Madrid (archaeology); University College London (master); University of Leicester (PhD)
- Occupations: YouTuber; Archaeologist

YouTube information
- Channel: PutoMikel
- Years active: 2017–present
- Genre: Commentary
- Subscribers: 286 thousand
- Views: 18.7 million
- Last updated: 22 October 2025
- Website: www.putomikel.com

Mikel Herrán Subiñas (born 1991), known in social media as PutoMikel, is a Spanish archaeologist, drag artist, writer, popularizer and YouTuber.

== Career ==
Mikel Herrán is an archaeologist from the Complutense University of Madrid, Master in Archaeology of the Arab and Islamic World from University College London - Qatar and PhD in archaeology from the University of Leicester. His research focuses on domestic environments and practices as spaces for social transformation in the early Andalusian period.

He became known in 2018 through his videos of historical content on the YouTube platform, analyzing Western history from a queer and decolonial perspective, and addressing topics such as the perception that gender was held in Viking society or expressions of sex-gendered dissidence in history. Through the use of social networks he seeks to bring historical studies out of academia and closer to a general audience.

In 2022 he launched his first work, La historia no es la que es, es la que te cuentan, published by Editorial Planeta, in which he treats history as a subjective narration and the way in which it is constructed.

In June 2023, he was a guest on the Movidas Varias podcast, hosted by comic book artist Quan Zhou Wu.

In 2024 he published his second book, Sodomitas, vagas y maleantes: Historia de la España desviada de Atapuerca a Chueca, which narrates the history of sexual and gender dissidence and LGBT people in the Iberian Peninsula. Likewise, since January of that year, he has been part of the team of the science outreach program of the fourth season of El condensador de fluzo, hosted by Raquel Martos, and broadcast by La 2 of Televisión Española. Later, in July, he took part in the Feminist School of the Assembly Moza d'Asturies (AMA), a conference held at the Muséu del Pueblu'Asturies in Gijón.

== Works ==
- La historia no es la que es: Es la que te cuentan (2022)
- Sodomitas, vagas y maleantes: Historia de la España desviada de Atapuerca a Chueca (2024)
