= Girl Online =

2014 novel by Zoe Sugg

- UK first edition
- Author: Zoe Sugg
- Audio read by: Hannah Toin
- Language: English
- Series: Girl Online
- Genre: Romance / Drama
- Published: 2014 (Penguin); 2014 (Atria)
- Publication place: United Kingdom
- Media type: Print (Hardback) & eBook
- ISBN: 978-0-1413-5727-0
- Followed by: Girl Online: On Tour

Girl Online is the debut novel by English author and internet celebrity Zoe Sugg. The romance and drama novel, released on 25 November 2014 through Penguin Books, is aimed at a teen audience and focuses on a fifteen-year-old anonymous blogger and what happens when her blog goes viral. The novel is a New York Times Best Seller in the Young Adult category. The book was the fastest-selling book of 2014 and it broke the record for highest first-week sales for a debut author since records began.

== Plot ==
Penny Porter is a 15-year-old girl living in Brighton, with her best friend Elliot and a picture-perfect family. She has an outgrown friend Megan, her long-lasting crush Ollie, and a secret – she has anxiety. She leads a mundane life and is not happy with herself. When an incident at school triggers her badly, her family takes her to New York, where her mother is planning a wedding. There she meets Noah, the wedding caterer's grandson. The two hit it off instantly and fall in love in the days that follow. After the wedding Penny leaves New York. She returns to Brighton a confident bright girl who realizes her worth and has a cute American boyfriend. A plot twist follows.

== Background ==
While based around similar experiences, Sugg has stated that the book is "in no way autobiographical". The book was listed before release by pop culture website ANDPOP as one of "10 Books by Celebrities that are Worth Reading".

=== Authorship ===
Penguin stated that "Sugg did not write Girl Online on her own", stating that she "has worked with an expert editorial team to help her bring to life her characters and experiences in a heartwarming and compelling story". It has been reported that young-adult novelist Siobhan Curham was a ghostwriter for the novel, although this has not been confirmed by Sugg, Curham, or Penguin. Penguin stated that Curham was an "editorial consultant" for the novel.

== Publication history ==
Girl Online was officially released on 25 November 2014, though Penguin stated that due to high demand "every bookseller broke the embargo on its sale" before this date. The book was in the amazon.co.uk "Top 100 Best Seller" list for 67 days prior to release, reaching third position, based on pre-sales alone. The novel entered The New York Times Best Seller list for young adult fiction in position 9 for the week ending 14 December, dropping to 13 the following week. Sugg went on a book signing tour in the UK to promote the release of the novel. The sessions were held at secret locations and ticketed for health and safety concerns, due to the exceptional demand.

The UK and US covers feature different images provided by Sugg's fans, selected via a competition hosted on Instagram.

=== Release ===
Girl Online broke the record for the highest ever first-week sales for a debut author since records began in 1998, selling a total of 78,109 copies, making it the fastest selling book of 2014. As of April 2015 343,562 copies had been sold.

- 2014, UK, Penguin Books ISBN 978-0-1413-5727-0, pub date 25 Nov 2014, Hardback
- 2014, USA, Atria ISBN 978-1-4767-9745-8, pub date 25 Nov 2014, Hardback
- 2014, Penguin Books, pub date 25 Nov 2014, Audiobook

=== Sequel ===
A sequel entitled Girl Online: On Tour was released on 20 October 2015.

=== Third book ===
A third book, Girl Online: Going Solo was confirmed by Sugg on 8 July 2016 and published on 17 November 2016.

== Reception ==
Girl Online received a mixed review from Anita Singh for The Daily Telegraph, who awarded it a score of three out of five. Singh found the romance to be unrealistic and stated that "the teenagers in this book bear no resemblance to any I have ever met", while also acknowledging that she is "not Zoella's target market" and that "times must have changed". She further states that while the book itself is "sugary as a frosted cupcake", "so is Zoella and six million YouTube subscribers love her that way" and that "Sugg has tapped into a truth"; "growing up doesn't have to mean leaving childish stuff behind."

The novel was well received by Daisy Wyatt, for The Independent, who found the novel "difficult to fault", calling it "fun and easy to relate to, while also having a positive message". Wyatt found, however, that "while Girl Online does teach sound advice to teenagers about being cautious of their online activity", Sugg has "found fame and fortune in sharing personal details on the internet" and felt that her fans are more likely to copy her than the fictional Penny. The novel was well received in The Guardian, with reviewer 'lilybelle' stating "I could relate so much to everything" and that "This book inspired me... I literally feel as though I've changed overnight". She also found that Sugg "made Penny a bit too similar to herself", making it "confusing at times", but described the novel overall as "special and inspiring."
