= Hazel Hayes =

Irish author and filmmaker (born 1985)

- Born: 21 January 1985 (age 41); Donaghmede, Dublin, Ireland
- Education: Dublin City University (BA)
- Occupations: Author; filmmaker; host; actress; YouTuber

YouTube information
- Channel: Hazel Hayes
- Years active: 2011–present
- Genre: Lifestyle
- Subscribers: 226 thousand
- Views: 20.8 million
- Last updated: 2 April 2026

Hazel Hayes (born 21 January 1985), formerly known online as ChewingSand, is an Irish author, YouTuber, presenter and filmmaker based in London. She gained prominence on YouTube through her short films and series, as well as the interview series Tipsy Talk. She has authored the novels Out Of Love (2020) and Better By Far (2024).

== Early life and education ==
Hayes was born and raised in Donaghmede, a suburb of north Dublin. She has an older sister and two older brothers. She graduated from Dublin City University in 2007, where she served as deputy president of the Student Union, with a Bachelor of Arts in Journalism. She then took classes at the Irish Writers' Centre.

== Career ==
Hayes began her career working for Google and then YouTube as a manager before becoming a YouTuber herself.

Hayes began her interview series, Tipsy Talk in 2013 in which she interviews popular creators and later celebrities whilst intaking alcohol. She is also known for her short films and web series. Her 2014 short film, Dementia, was nominated for and won a work shop competition with Guillermo del Toro. Later, in 2017, she directed Fullscreen series Prank Me starring Corey Fogelmanis. The series earned her an Excellence in Storytelling award at the 2017 Buffer Festival. Other works includes her vlogs Time of the Month, web series Unnecessary Otter, pilot Hot Mess, and short films Super Brainy Zombies and Septem.

She has since directed dodie's music video for her song "Human" in 2018 and later 'I Kissed Someone (It Wasn't You)' and Anna Akana's 2019 "Disappointment" music video.

In November 2018, Hayes announced her debut novel, Out of Love, a romance novel she would publish through Unbound. It was announced on its release date in June 2020 that Rabbit Track Pictures had picked up the rights to the novel, with Hayes writing and Kitty Kaletsky overseeing the film adaption.

Hayes began hosting Prime Video Club alongside Munya Chawawa for Amazon Prime Video in April 2020, a series discussing various series and films on the platform.

Her second novel Better by Far was published in 2024. She launched her podcast, named after her first book Out Of Love in October 2026.

== Personal life ==
Hayes moved to London in 2012. She lived with musician Dodie Clark for many years.

Hayes came out as bisexual in 2016. In 2025, she was diagnosed with autism and ADHD.

== Bibliography ==
- Out of Love (2020)
- Better By Far (2024)

== Filmography ==
=== Series ===
- Unnecessary Otter (2014)
- PrankMe (2017)

=== Short films ===
- Super Brainy Zombies (2014)
- Dementia (2014)
- Septem (2015)
- Sexy Torture Chamber (2015)
- Not the John Lewis Christmas Advert (2015)
- Happy (2016)
- Hot Mess (2016)
- Anxious (2018)

=== Music videos ===
- "Human" (2018) - Dodie Clark
- "Disappointment" (2019) - Anna Akana
- "I Kissed Someone (It Wasn't You)" (2021) - Dodie Clark

== Awards and nominations ==
Won Guillermo del Toro competition for Dementia.

Year	Association	Category	Nominated work	Result	Ref.
2012	Shorty Awards	Ireland	Hazel Hayes	Nominated	
2016	Summer in the City Awards	YouTuber Series of the Year	Time of the Month	Nominated	
2016	Summer in the City Awards	Short film of the Year	Septem	Nominated	
2017	Summer in the City Awards	Film of the Year	Hot Mess	Nominated	
2017	Buffer Festival	Excellence in Storytelling	PrankMe	Won	
2018	Streamy Awards	Directing	PrankMe	Nominated	
2018	Summer in the City Awards	Creator Series of the Year	PrankMe	Won	
