= Rose and Rosie =

British YouTubers and comedy duo

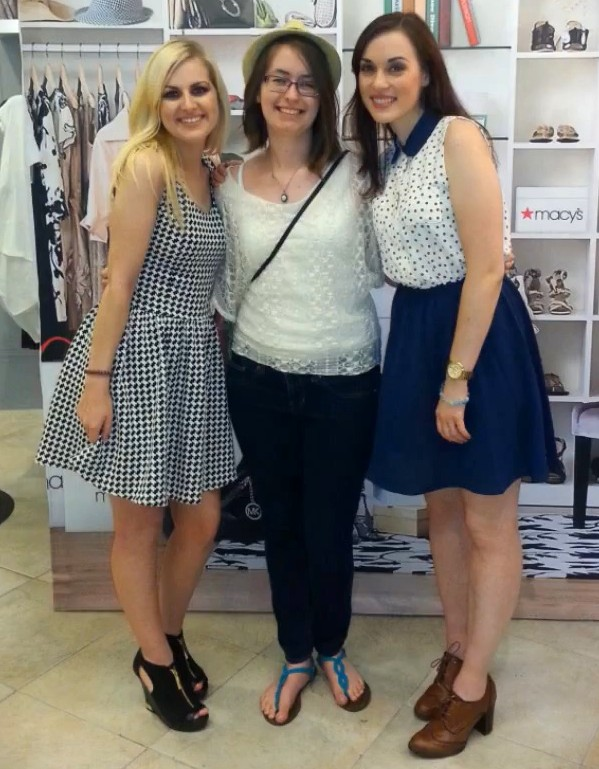
- Rosie Spaughton (left) and Rose Ellen Dix (right) in 2014
- Rose Ellen Dix
- Born: 15 June 1988 (age 38); Hereford, Herefordshire
- Education: Hereford College of Arts (BA)
- Rosie Spaughton
- Born: Roseanne Elizabeth Spaughton; 30 May 1990 (age 36); Milton Keynes, Buckinghamshire
- Education: University of Worcester (BA)

YouTube information
- Channel: Rose and Rosie
- Years active: 2010–present
- Genres: People; Comedy
- Subscribers: 972 thousand
- Views: 259 million
- Last updated: 21 October 2025

Rose Ellen Dix (born 15 June 1988) and Rosie Spaughton (born 30 May 1990) are a married British comedy and entertainment duo who have gained popularity through their YouTube videos.

== Early life ==
- Rose Ellen Dix was born in Hereford and grew up in Ross-on-Wye with her brother, John and her sister, Laura. She attended the Bishop of Hereford's Bluecoat School before going on to study at Hereford College of Arts, graduating with a Bachelor of Arts in Film and Screen Media.
- Roseanne Elizabeth Spaughton was born in Milton Keynes. She has two older brothers, Tom and William, and two younger half siblings through her mother, Joe and Isobel. Rosie's parents divorced when she was 3; she was raised by her mother in Malvern, Worcestershire whilst her father stayed in Milton Keynes. She attended Dyson Perrins Church of England Academy before going on to study at the University of Worcester, graduating with a Bachelor of Arts in Media & Culture.

== Career ==
=== YouTube ===
Rose Dix joined YouTube for a university class, establishing the Rose Ellen Dix channel. She uploaded her first video, entitled "Rose Dix talks Lisa Scinta," on 30 September 2010. An early assignment during her film degree included attempting to make a video go viral. Dix posted a parody of Kesha's Tik Tok on 26 January 2011, and the video received an estimated 16,000 views in five days.

Rosie Spaughton uploaded her first video, entitled "YDAHD," to her channel TheRoxetera, on 19 December 2011. She first appears on the Rose Ellen Dix channel in "Baffle Laffle Taffle Breakup" posted on 18 December 2011. Their first posted collaboration video was uploaded on 15 January 2012 to the Rose Ellen Dix channel.

In 2014, Rose quit her job at an Apple Store in Worcester to focus on YouTube full-time. On 29 April 2016, Rose and Rosie expanded their presence on YouTube by creating a new channel called "Let's Play Games,” on which they post gaming videos, which were already present on their main channel, Rose Ellen Dix. However, they decided to make a place for more on this channel.

In August 2016, they both made the AfterEllen Hot 100 list with Rosie at number 23 and Rose at 18. They also hit 100 million views on their main channel that month.

Rosie's channel, TheRoxetera, was renamed Rose and Rosie Vlogs and Rose's Rose Ellen Dix became Rose and Rosie.

On 23 May 2021 their main channel hit 1 million subscribers.

==== Channels and content ====
The Rose and Rosie channel contains content in the style of “couch comedy” as well as challenges, tags, guides, gaming videos, and collaborations with other YouTubers, such as Hannah Witton, Hannah Hart, Shannon Beveridge, Cammie Scott, Amy Ordman, and Oli White. The couple has also collaborated with Grace Helbig.

The Rose and Rosie Vlogs channel contains vlogs and various series, such as annual VLOGMAS videos, #RealTalk, and the BISEXY SERIES. In #RealTalk, Rose and Rosie attempt to discuss real-life conflicts/situations and use their personal experiences to share advice with viewers. Some of the pair's #RealTalk videos include videos titled “How to Have a Good Relationship,” “Living with OCD,” and “Controlling Your Jealousy.” In the BISEXY SERIES, Rosie talks about her experiences as a bisexual woman. Some of the videos in this series include “How Do You Know You’re Bisexual” and “Dealing With Biphobia & Homophobia.”

Let's Play Games is Rose and Rosie's third channel devoted to playing video games, including “Until Dawn,” “GTA 5,” “FIFA,” and “The Sims 4.”

Maltese is an alter-ego created by Rose who appears in a number of videos such as “THIS IS JUST RIDICULOUS,” “SUPERKISS PART 3,” and “Acting 101 with Maltese Van de Kamp.” Maltese is a snobbish character with an accent, claiming to be “Canadian/Rhode Island royalty.”

=== Radio and television ===
Rosie worked for Sunshine Radio (FM) before pursuing YouTube full-time.

In November 2014, the couple hosted the Holiday Window Unveiling in Macy's, Pittsburgh. They have since appeared on BBC Radio 1's series The Internet Takeover, including a Christmas special in 2016 with Ben Cook, Jim Chapman, and hosts Dan and Phil. They have also presented for MTV.

In May 2016, Rose and Rosie featured in episode 2 of Russel Kane's Stupid Man, Smart Phone on BBC Three. The episode saw them try to survive in Arctic Norway and was filmed in November 2015.

In June 2016, Dix and Spaughton were selected by Sony Pictures as two of 15 influencers in social media to promote Sony's then upcoming movies Inferno and Ghostbusters during a public relations blitz in Singapore. The pair participated in a scavenger hunt, and met Tom Hanks and Ron Howard as well as interviewed Melissa McCarthy and Paul Feig. Vlogs of their scavenger hunt and interviews were later posted on Rose Ellen Dix.

The couple often expressed their admiration for former Fifth Harmony group-member Camila Cabello in their videos. In October 2017, they had the opportunity to interview Cabello at the BBC Radio 1's Teen Awards.

=== Meet ups and tours ===
Dix and Spaughton used to refer to their fans as "Boobies." In 2019 they started referring to their fans as "Frogs". They first held an organized meet and greet in London in 2013. In 2014, they coordinated a meet and greet with fellow YouTuber couples Whitney and Megan, and Kaelyn and Lucy. Rose and Rosie's couple nickname was The Roses, Whitney and Megan's was Wegan, and Kaelyn and Lucy's was Luclyn. Thus, the meet and greet was known as "ROSWEGLYN" and had an estimated 600 attendees. In April 2017, Dix and Spaughton toured the United Kingdom and Ireland, and in September 2017 continued their tour, titled "Rose & Rosie: Exposed" in North America.

In May 2018, the couple announced that in October 2018 they would be going on tour to promote their book and documentary, both titled, "Overshare" in the UK. This tour contained a showing of their documentary, a book signing and a Q & A.

=== Book and documentary ===
In May 2018, Dix and Spaughton announced the release of their book, "Overshare: Love, Laughs, Sexuality and Secrets." The book was published on 4 October 2018. The same day, Dix and Spaughton announced they filmed a documentary, which includes members from their audience. The documentary is also titled, "Overshare".

=== Podcast ===
In August 2020, the duo launched a Spotify Original podcast called "Parental Guidance" documenting their journey to motherhood. The first season documented their fertility journey, including the processes of searching for a sperm donor and undergoing IUI. In the second season they announced and discussed Rosie's pregnancy and impending motherhood. The third and fourth seasons explored parenting as an LGBTQ+ couple, and postpartum mental health struggles. They frequently hosted guests to discuss a variety of parenting topics. The podcast concluded in June 2022.

== Personal life ==
Rose and Rosie first met in 2007 at a Halloween party at the ages of 19 and 17 respectively, but were both in relationships at the time. Rose is a lesbian and Rosie is bisexual. Once both single, they went on their first date on 20 October 2011, and made their relationship official on 19 July 2012. Rose proposed on Rosie's birthday, 30 May 2014, and the wedding took place in England at Clearwell Castle on 20 March 2015.

As of 2024, the pair lives in the Cotswolds with their two sons; two dogs, Wilma and Woodstock "Woody"; and a cat, Flynn. They previously lived in Worcester and Hertfordshire.

In April 2019, the couple announced that they had chosen a joint married name, Daughton, use of which however is not reflected in their social media activities.

Shortly after midnight on 9 April 2020, Rosie revealed through social media that Rose was in hospital suffering a difficult miscarriage. Rosie was unable to be with Rose at hospital in light of COVID-19 pandemic restrictions. They later posted a video that went into more depth about the traumatic experience.

They have two children; Rosie gave birth to their first son (Ziggy Wilder) in July 2021 and Rose had their second son (Rocky Elwood) in August 2024.

== Reception ==
Rose and Rosie have been praised for their "positive content and open dialogue around LGBT issues."

== Bibliography ==
- Overshare: Love, Laughs, Sexuality and Secrets. 2018. ISBN 9781409176428

== Awards ==
Year	Award	Category	Result
2015	AfterEllen Visibility Awards	Favorite Real Life Lesbian Couple	Won
2016	British LGBT Awards	LGBT Celebrity Rising Star Award	Won
2016	Lovie Awards	Lovie Creators for Change Award	Won
2017	Summer in the City	Series of the Year Award: Bisexy Series - Rosie Spaughton	Nominated
2017	Summer in the City	Vlogger of the Year Award	Won
2017	BBC Radio 1 Teen Awards	Best British Vlogger	Won
2017	DIVA Awards	Entertainment Personality	Won
2018	Barclays DIVA Awards	Online Influencer Award	Won
2020	Shorty Awards	Best LGBTQ+ Account	Won
2021	British LGBT Awards	Broadcaster, Journalist, or Host	Nominated
