= Zoe Sugg =

English vlogger, businesswoman and author (born 1990)

Zoë Sugg
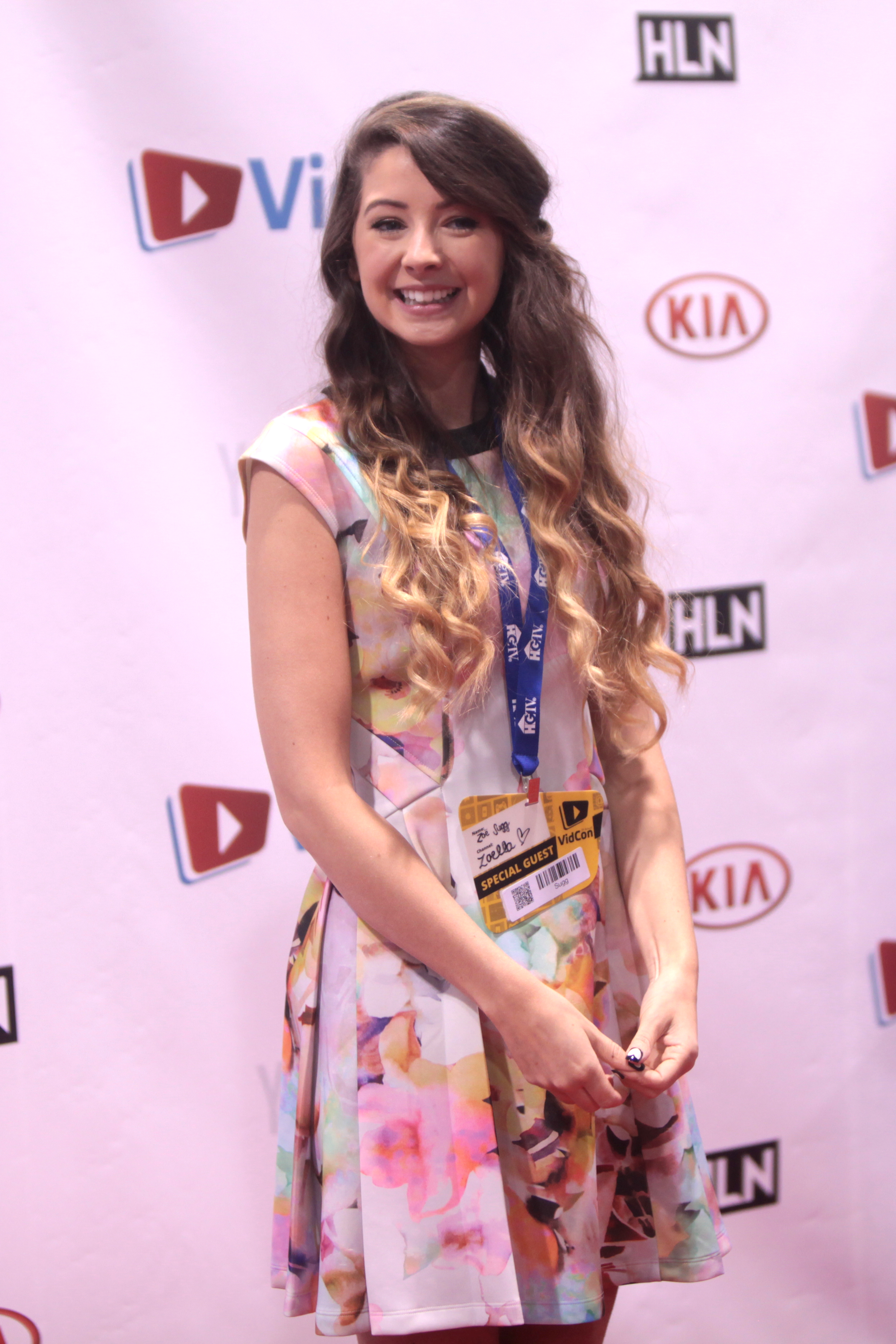
- Sugg in 2014
- Born: Zoë Elizabeth Sugg; 28 March 1990 (age 36); Lacock, Wiltshire, England
- Occupations: Media personality; entrepreneur; author
- Years active: 2009-present
- Partner(s): Alfie Deyes (2012–present; engaged)
- Children: 2
- Relatives: Joe Sugg (brother)

YouTube information
- Channels: Zoella; Zoe Sugg
- Subscribers: 10.5 million (main); 5 million (vlogs)
- Views: 1.07 billion (main); 1.1 billion (vlogs)
- Last updated: 21 October 2025
- Website: zoella.co.uk

Zoë Elizabeth Sugg (born 28 March 1990), also known by her online name Zoella, is an English media personality, entrepreneur and author. She began her career as a YouTuber in 2009 and has since amassed over 10 million subscribers.

Her debut novel, Girl Online, was published in November 2014 and broke the record for highest first-week sales of a first-time novelist. She has since released two sequels and a non-fiction book, Cordially Invited, and later co-wrote the book duology The Magpie Society with Amy McCulloch.

== Early life ==
Zoë Elizabeth Sugg was born in Lacock, Wiltshire, on 28 March 1990. She has a younger brother, Joe Sugg, who is also a YouTuber. She attended The Corsham School in nearby Corsham. She earned A-levels in art, photography, and textiles, but did not attend university due to her anxiety disorder and not knowing what she wanted to do later in life.

== Career ==
=== 2009–2013: Career beginnings ===
Sugg was working as an apprentice at an interior design company when she created her blog, "Zoella", in February 2009. By the end of the year it had a thousand followers and as of September 2015 it had received over 540 million total visits. The fashion, beauty and lifestyle blog expanded into a YouTube channel in 2009, while Sugg was working for British clothing retailer New Look. Sugg's main channel, Zoella, first named "zoella280390" after her birth date, is mostly fashion, beauty hauls, and "favourites" videos (showing her favourite products of the previous month). Her second channel, MoreZoella, contains mostly vlogs where she shows her viewers what she does in her day. She is a member of the Style Haul network and is represented by Dominic Smales at Gleam Futures. In 2013, Sugg was mentioned by The Telegraph as one of "Britain's most influential Tweeters". In 2013, she was named as one of the National Citizen Service's ambassadors, helping to promote the newly launched youth service. The following year, she was named as the first "digital ambassador" for Mind, the mental health charity.

=== 2014–2019: Zoella brands, book releases and media appearances ===
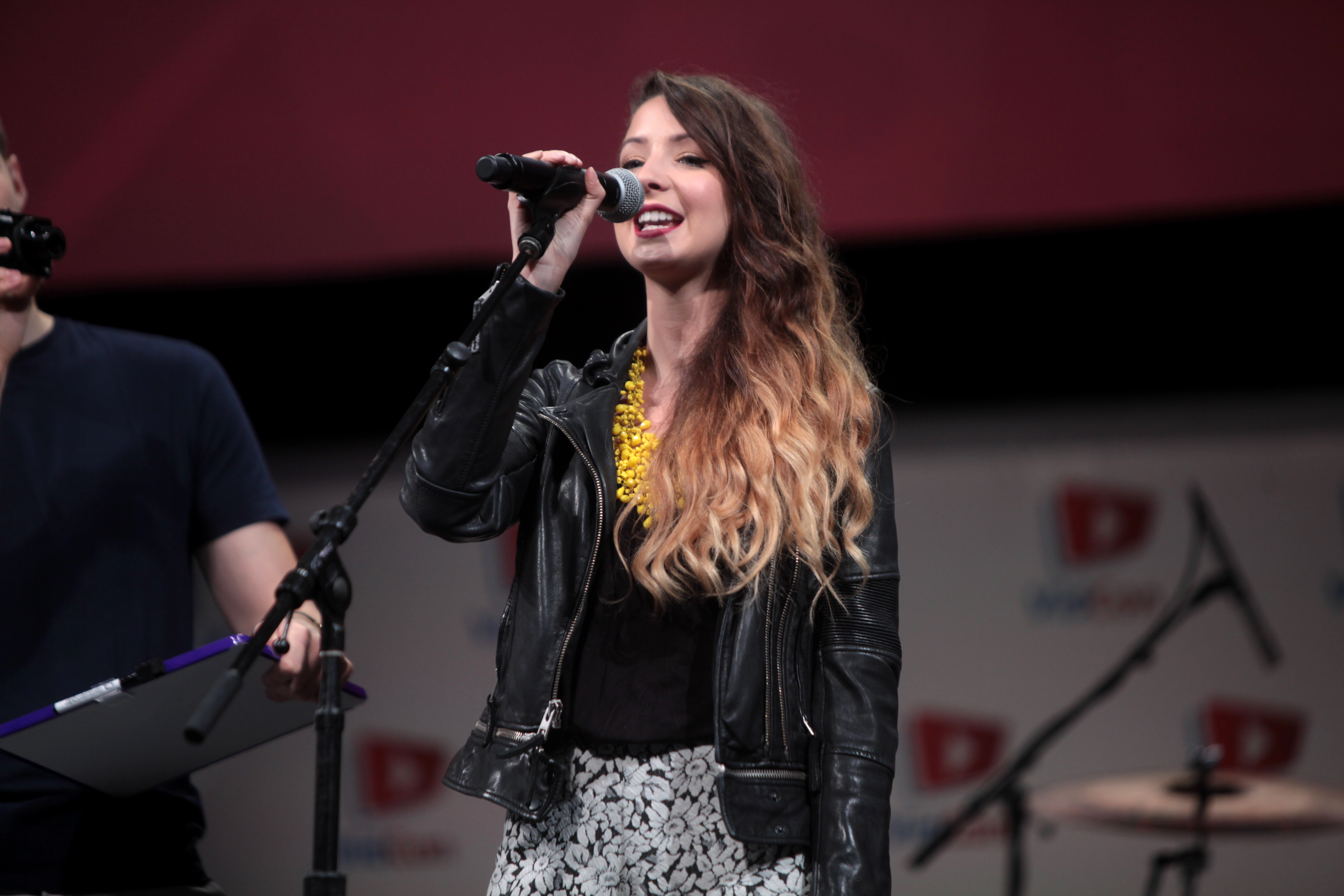
Sugg speaking at Vidcon in 2014

Sugg launched a range of beauty products under the brand name Zoella Beauty in September 2014. The "bath and beauty" range launch was, according to the Metro, the "biggest beauty launch of the year". The products were developed and manufactured by Gloucestershire-based family-owned company SLG Allstars Ltd. She launched an edition of the products called "Tutti Fruity" in 2015, as well as a limited Christmas edition. Sugg has been a director of ZS Beauty Ltd, a wholesaler of perfume and cosmetics, since 2016. In 2016, Sugg launched an edition called "Sweet Inspirations", followed by other ranges including "Jelly & Gelato", "Splash Botanics" and "Fruit Medley".

In September 2016, Sugg released a collection of home-ware products, including stationery, candles and reed diffusers. Sugg has been a director of ZS Lifestyle Ltd since 2016. In June 2014, Sugg was a guest panellist on the daytime chat show Loose Women. She also appeared on This Morning in July 2014 to talk about social anxiety. In 2014, Sugg signed a two-book deal with Penguin Books. The North American publishing rights were purchased by Atria. Sugg's debut novel, Girl Online, was released on 25 November 2014. The book is aimed at a young adult audience and surrounds a 15-year-old anonymous blogger and what happens when her blog goes viral. While based around her similar experiences, Sugg has stated that the book is "in no way autobiographical". The novel achieved the highest first-week sales for a debut author since Nielsen BookScan began compiling such records in 1998, with 78,109 copies. As of December 2014, it was the fastest selling book of the year. Penguin stated that "Sugg did not write Girl Online on her own", stating that she had "worked with an expert editorial team to help her bring to life her characters and experiences in a heartwarming and compelling story". It was reported that young-adult novelist Siobhan Curham was a ghostwriter for the novel, although neither Penguin nor Sugg confirmed this; Penguin stated that Curham was an editorial consultant for the novel.

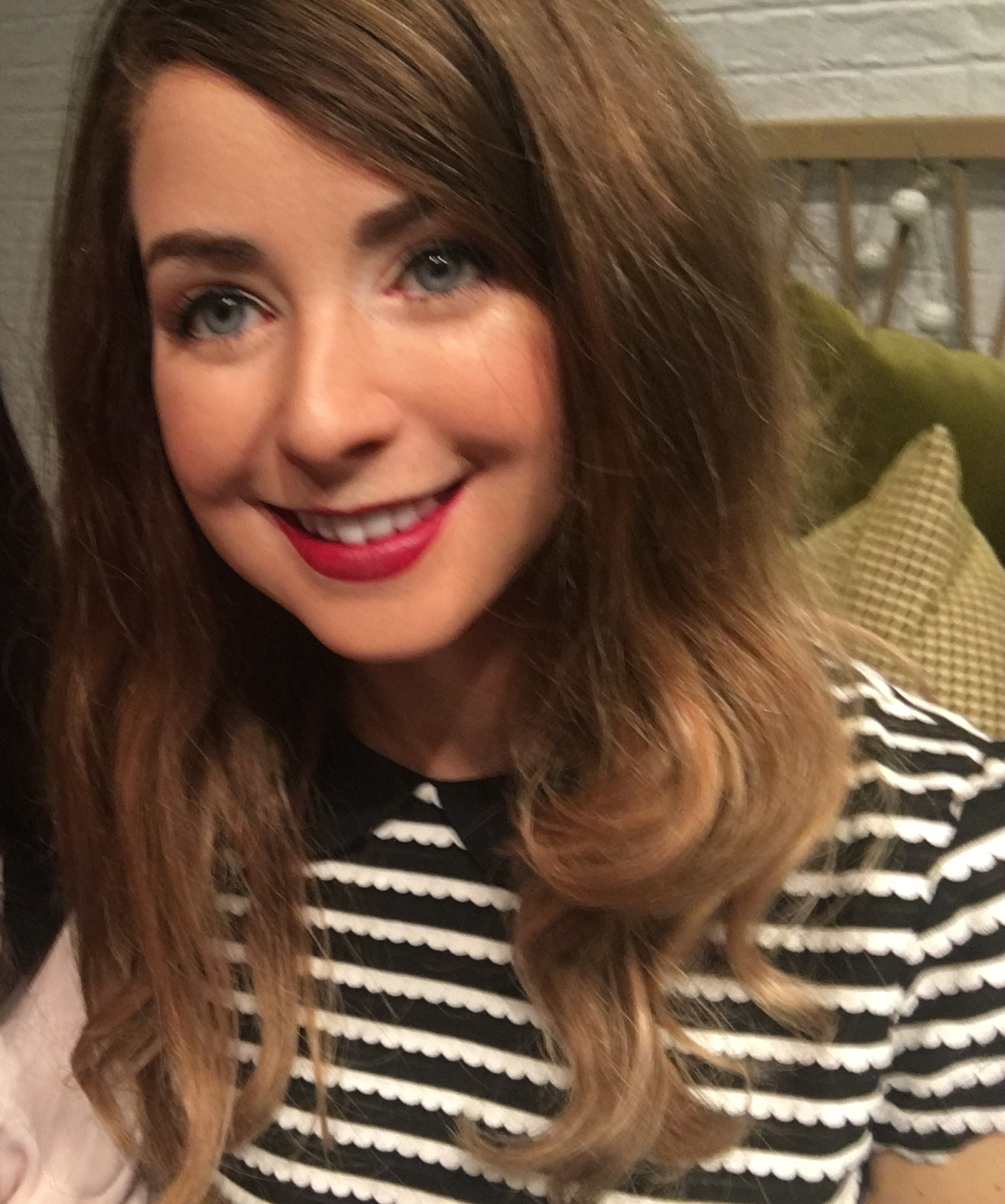
Sugg's wax figure at Madame Tussauds

Sugg, along with The Slow Mo Guys and Vice News, featured in television, print, and billboard advertisements by YouTube in the UK which ran from 25 September 2014. The prime time TV adverts were broadcast on the three terrestrial UK channels. Sugg then featured on the 2014 single "Do They Know It's Christmas?" as part of the Band Aid 30 charity supergroup, raising money for the Ebola virus epidemic in West Africa. The single debuted at No.1 on the UK Official Singles Chart. Sugg also took part in the 2015 Comic Relief edition of The Great British Bake Off. A sequel to Girl Online, titled Girl Online: On Tour, was released on 20 October 2015. A third book, Girl Online: Going Solo, was published on 17 November 2016. Sugg's books, alongside those by other YouTubers, were criticised in 2017 for 'not being challenging enough' in a number of UK newspapers.

In late 2016, Sugg and brother Joe released a range of branded merchandise called 'Sugg Life', created in collaboration with The Creator Store, a company owned by Alfie Deyes and Dominic Smales of Gleam Futures. The term 'Sugg Life' is a play on 'Thug life', a phrase popularised by Tupac Shakur's 1990s hip hop group of the same name and more recently an internet meme. The online shop offered a range of products such as hoodies, stickers and phone cases. In August 2017, The Creator Store opened a pop-up shop in Covent Garden which, for ten days, sold limited edition 'Sugg Life X PB' merchandise; a collaboration of Sugg Life and Deyes' 'Pointless Blog' brands. As of May 2018, the Sugg Life online shop is no longer active. Sugg and Deyes are directors of A to Z Creatives and A to Z Merchandise, a Brighton-based brand agency, which they founded in 2018. They are also directors of Crew Live Limited (the company responsible for YouTube convention Hello World) alongside fellow YouTubers Tanya Burr, Marcus Butler, Jim Chapman, Caspar Lee, Louise Pentland, Niomi Smart, Joe Sugg, and Gleam Futures CEO Dominic Smales.

Sugg's non-fiction book, Cordially Invited, offering advice on entertaining guests at home and planning celebrations, was published by Hodder & Stoughton in October 2018.

=== 2019–present: Business interests and The Magpie Society ===
In February 2019, it was announced that Sugg had worked on a limited edition makeup range with ColourPop Cosmetics, based on 70s fashion. In April 2019, Sugg announced Filmm, a mobile photography app that she co-developed with Elsie Larson and Emma Chapman. In August 2020, Sugg collaborated on a homeware range with Etsy, featuring products co-curated by herself and independent Etsy sellers.

On 29 October 2020, The Magpie Society: One for Sorrow, a young adult fiction novel she co-authored with Amy McCulloch, was released. The book details events at an elite boarding school from the points of view of two girls – Ivy, written by Sugg, and Audrey, written by McCulloch. It was stated by Sugg that the book would act as the first of a series, with a sequel titled The Magpie Society: Two for Joy which was released in 2021.

== Personal life ==
Sugg has been in a relationship with vlogger Alfie Deyes since October 2012. They made their relationship public in a blog post by Sugg in August 2013. They became engaged in September 2023. They have two daughters, born August 2021 and December 2023, respectively. The family reside in Sussex near Hurstpierpoint–Hassocks; she was previously based in Brighton.

Sugg and Deyes acquired a pug in 2014. In 2026, they were granted planning permission from Mid Sussex District Council to build a donkey sanctuary.

Sugg attracted criticism from the media in November 2017 after releasing a 12-door £50 advent calendar, with the "extortionate price" and alleged poor quality receiving attention. The calendar contained items such as a small pack of confetti, a packet of seven stickers, and cookie cutters. A spokesperson for Sugg said, "Zoe is incredibly proud of the Christmas collection and excited to see it in store. However, the pricing and in-store promotional strategy of the collection, including the calendar, is at the control of third parties and is not set by Zoe."

Also in November 2017, Sugg apologised following controversy surrounding posts she had made on social media between 2009 and 2012 mocking gay people and "fat chavs". She responded on Twitter, claiming the posts had been "taken out of context" and writing, "I'm sorry if I have offended anyone, that was not my intention."

Since January 2026, Sugg has been on an extended social media break, leaving fans uncertain as to her whereabouts and concerned over her health.

== Filmography ==
Year	Title	Role	Notes
2001	Harry Potter and the Philosopher's Stone	Girl in Potion Class	
2002	Harry Potter and the Chamber of Secrets	Slytherin Student	
2015	The Great Comic Relief Bake Off	Contestant	

== Bibliography ==
- Girl Online (2014)
- Girl Online: On Tour (2015)
- Girl Online: Going Solo (2016)
- Cordially Invited (2018)
- The Magpie Society: One for Sorrow (2020) (Note: Sugg co-authored this book with Amy McCulloch.)
- The Magpie Society: Two for Joy (2021)

== Awards and nominations ==
Sugg won the 2011 Cosmopolitan Blog Award in the "Best Established Beauty Blog" category and went on to win the "Best Beauty Vlogger" award the following year. She was also awarded the 2013 and 2014 "Best British Vlogger" award at the Radio 1 Teen Awards; the 2014 Nickelodeon Kids' Choice Award for "UK Favourite Vlogger"; and the 2014 Teen Choice Award for "Choice Web Star: Fashion/Beauty".

Sugg was listed as one of The Telegraph's "40 best beauty bloggers" in September 2014, and "Queen of the Haul" by British Vogue in November. Hers was the fourth most popular channel in the UK in 2014. She was included in the 2015 Debrett's 500, listing the most influential people in Britain, under the New Media category. In 2015 she was named as the "Most Inspirational Women of the Decade" in technology by Grazia and she was named the 34th Sexiest Woman in the world by FHM.

Sugg won the "Choice Web Star" award in the 'Fashion/Beauty' category at the 2015 Teen Choice Awards. In 2019, Sugg, alongside her brother, was nominated for Social Media Superstar at the 2019 Global Awards.

Year	Award	Category	Result
2011	Cosmopolitan Blog Award	Best Established Beauty Blog	Won
2012	Cosmopolitan Blog Award	Best Beauty Vlogger	Won
2014	Nickelodeon Kids' Choice Award	UK Favourite Vlogger	Won
2014	Teen Choice Award	Choice Webstar: Fashion/Beauty	Won
2014	Radio 1 Teen Award	Best British Vlogger	Won
2015	Teen Choice Award	Choice Webstar: Fashion/Beauty	Won
2016	Shorty Award	YouTuber of the Year	Nominated
2018	Teen Choice Award	Choice Webstar: Fashion/Beauty	Nominated
2019	Global Awards	Social Media Superstar	Nominated
