= Niki and Sammy Albon =

British YouTubers

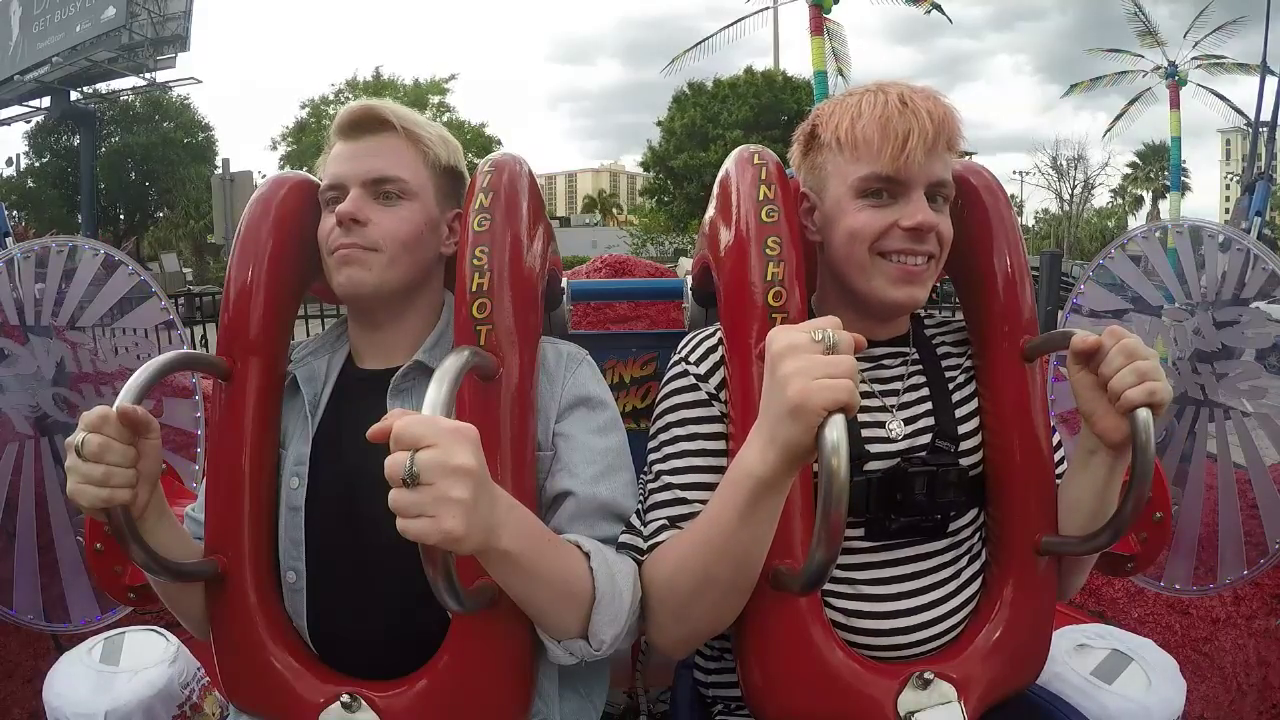
- The Albons in 2017
- Born: 20 February 1992 (age 34); Canvey Island, Essex, UK
- Education: University of Roehampton
- Occupations: YouTuber, Presenter, Digital Creator
- Years active: 2013–2021
- Website: www.nikinsammy.co.uk

Niki and Sammy Albon (born 20 February 1992) are former British YouTube personalities, radio presenters and digital creators.

== Background ==
Niki and Sammy are twins are from Canvey Island in Essex. They graduated from Roehampton University. Niki has a bachelor's degree in History and Journalism, and Sammy has a bachelor's degree in Classical Civilisation.

Niki came out as gay in 2020.

== Careers ==
=== YouTube ===
The pair launched the Niki 'n' Sammy YouTube channel in June 2013. As of May 2020, the channel has 184,000 subscribers. After losing a combined 16 stone (101 kg), they were interviewed on Irish radio and Australian television.

In January 2019, they relaunched their YouTube career with a new channel called TTK (Twins Talk Kpop.) The channel features content discussing Kpop in the UK, a niche they occupied after the popularity of Kpop episodes from the Peachy Podcast.

=== Hosting ===
They have hosted the CBBC Official Chart Show, a BBC Radio 1 programme, and are an Anti-Bullying Ambassador. They were backstage hosts at the 2016 BBC Music Awards. In 2018, they hosted the BRIT Awards Social Squad. In the same year, they also hosted Girl Guides Gig at Wembley Arena twice. During the 2015 United Kingdom general election, the twins interviewed Labour leader Ed Miliband.

=== Advocacy ===
From 2015 to 2018, Niki and Sammy were the main hosts for the Stand Up to Cancer UK charity live stream on YouTube. The twins also rowed 27 miles as part of Stand Up to Cancer's Great Canoe Challenge.

== The Peachy Podcast ==
Niki and Sammy's Peachy Podcast
- Other names: Peachy Podcast
- Genre: Comedy, Entertainment, Music, Chat
- Country of origin: United Kingdom
- Language: English
- Home station: BBC Radio 1
- Hosted by: Niki Albon and Sammy Albon
- Original release: 19 February 2018 – 14 January 2019
- No. of series: 4
- Audio format: Stereophonic sound
- Website: https://www.bbc.co.uk/programmes/p05xxsh4

Niki and Sammy's Peachy Podcast was a British podcast which aired on BBC Radio 1 on Mondays. The first series ran between 19 February 2018 and 7 May 2018. There were four series in total, which featured interviews with guests including Steve Aoki, Monsta X, and Tiffany Young.
