= Are Dan and Phil in a Relationship? The Truth =

2026 YouTube video by Dan and Phil

- Daniel Howell (left) and Phil Lester (right) in 2026
- Release date: 13 October 2025
- Running time: 46 minutes
- Language: English

Are Dan and Phil in a Relationship? The Truth is a YouTube video by the British YouTubers Daniel Howell and Phil Lester, known together as Dan and Phil. It was released on 13 October 2025 via their YouTube channel Dan and Phil, which was previously known as Dan and Phil Games before the release of the video. The video marked the public announcement of Howell and Lester's romantic relationship, which had been the subject of previous public speculation, with fans of the couple shipping the duo, giving their relationship the nickname "Phan".

The video explored the couple's beginnings in 2009, their fear of publicly disclosing their sexual orientation and relationship, alongside instances of harassment and stalking by fans driven by speculation about their relationship. Howell and Lester also discussed the effects of these experiences on their mental health, including Howell's suicidal ideation. It followed their respective 2019 coming out videos, in which they publicly identified as gay and talked about their struggles with sexual identity, with Howell further discussing problems with internalised homophobia.

Are Dan and Phil in a Relationship? The Truth also served as an announcement of the couple's joint podcast, titled Hard Launch, with Lester and Howell later embarking on the Hard Launch Tour, marking their first tour as a public couple. The video led to widespread media coverage, with outlets describing "Phan" as one of the internet's biggest conspiracies and discussing the implications of stan culture, including parasocial interactions, doxxing, harassment and real person fiction. Formatted as a satirical conspiracy documentary, the 46-minute video amassed over 1.8 million views on YouTube less than 24 hours after its release.

== Background ==
In 2006, Phil Lester created his YouTube channel AmazingPhil. Daniel Howell later reached out to Lester after watching his videos, and the two became online friends. They first met in 2009 and began collaborating on YouTube videos that same year, including Phil Is Not on Fire, which was uploaded to Lester's channel. Continuing to rise in popularity, the pair continued to create content as a duo, moving together across England and starting the BBC Radio 1 radio show Dan and Phil, which aired from 2013 to 2014. They launched a collaborative YouTube channel named Dan and Phil Games that same year, becoming the fastest growing channel on the platform at the time. In late 2018, the pair announced a temporary hiatus from their collaborative works, initiating separate ventures.

On 14 June 2019, Howell released a video on his YouTube channel titled Basically I'm Gay, in which he came out, publicly identified as gay and discussed his experiences with self-hatred and abuse, which led to a suicide attempt during his teenage years. He also explained he had been romantically involved with Lester, but did not explain the state of their relationship. Weeks later, Lester also came out as gay in a YouTube video titled Coming Out to You, explaining knowing about his sexual orientation since age twelve. In 2024, Howell told People that Lester wanted to "revisit" Dan and Phil Games, which the pair had previously announced would go on temporary hiatus in 2018 until October 2023, after which they embarked on the Terrible Influence Tour, marking their first tour after publicly coming out as gay.

== Release ==
Daniel Howell

Phil Lester

Lester called the release of the video a "big scary deal", comparing it to "another mini coming out".

On 13 October 2025, Lester teased the release of news about the pair on X (formerly Twitter) in a cryptic post that read "If you've ever been into Dan and Phil you might want to be online in an hour or so", causing speculation among fans of them. Are Dan and Phil in a Relationship? The Truth was released that same day on the previously-named Dan and Phil Games YouTube channel, now simply called Dan and Phil.

After the release of the video, the pair posted a joint Instagram post featuring a selfie of them with its caption expressing gratitude for "everyone's thoughtful messages and insane shitposts". On 20 October, they released the first episode of their Hard Launch podcast, in which Howell described the video's release as "a huge relief".

== Synopsis ==
Are Dan and Phil in a Relationship? The Truth begins with Howell asking "[...] are Dan and Phil in a relationship?", with Lester simply responding with "yes", Howell then jokingly ends the video, after which he teases the video's premise. The pair then shares they "fell hard and fast", starting a romantic relationship shortly after meeting each other in 2009, with Howell noting that they only made it public "almost 16 years later". They also discussed how fan speculation about a potential romantic relationship between them led to instances of doxxing, harassment and stalking. The speculation was associated with the shipping of the pair, who were collectively known as "Phan". Howell and Lester also recounted an occasion when they were filmed at a supermarket.

Howell recounted having an "extremely homophobic childhood", which led him to remain "deep in the closet", develop internalised homophobia and hide his relationship with Lester, as he had also kept his sexual identity from friends and family. He further explained why the constant online "digging" had "hit a nerve" for him, describing Lester as his "safe space". They explained an occasion where Lester had created a private Valentine's Day video for Howell, which eventually got leaked due to a glitch on YouTube, causing the video to get reuploaded on the platform. Howell described the situation as feeling "like an assault", while Lester described it as a "breaking point" in their relationship.

Howell explained in the video having suicidal ideation due to the constant speculation surrounding his relationship with Lester. They also mentioned not holding a grudge against their fans' "invasive behaviour", with Howell calling them "young people that had absolutely no idea what the effects of their actions were". The pair also announced the launch of a Dan and Phil podcast, while denying pivoting into "couple vlogging" content.

== Reception ==
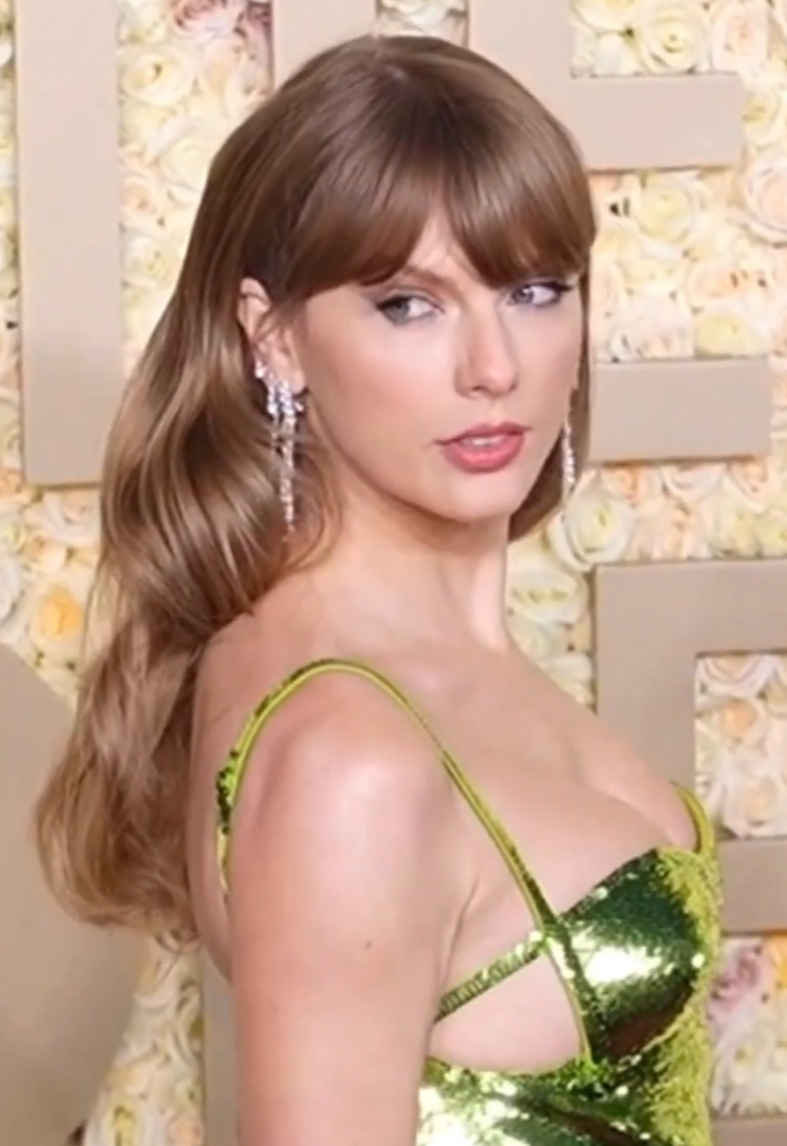
Taylor Swift

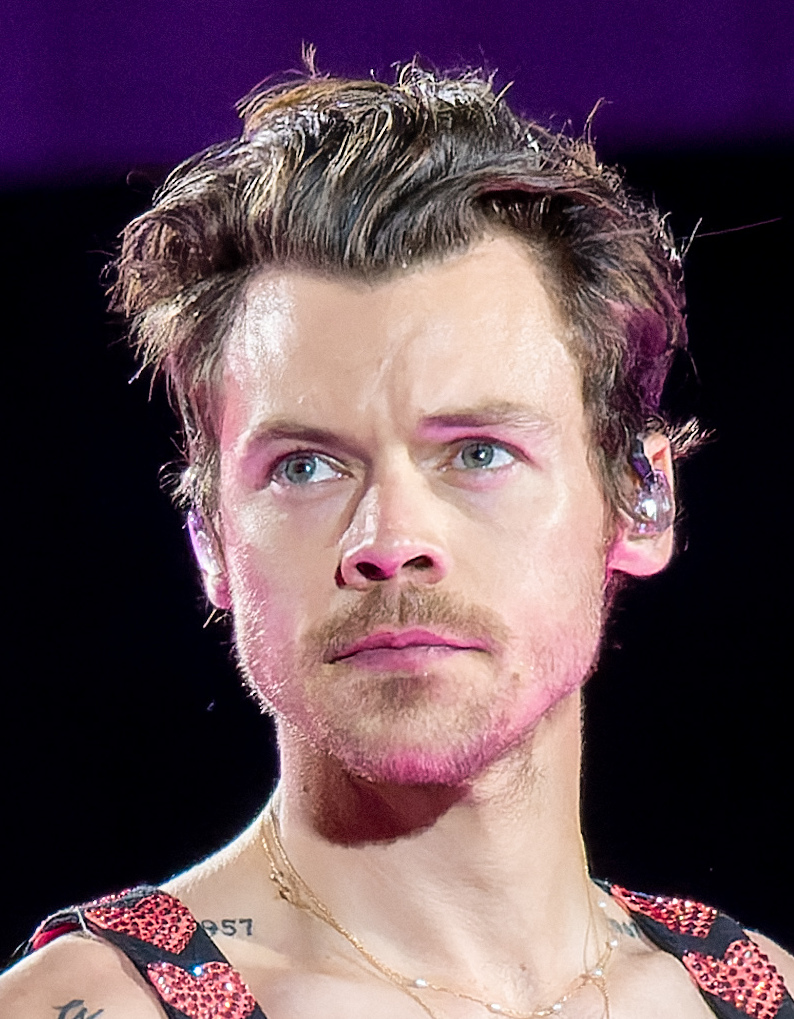
Harry Styles

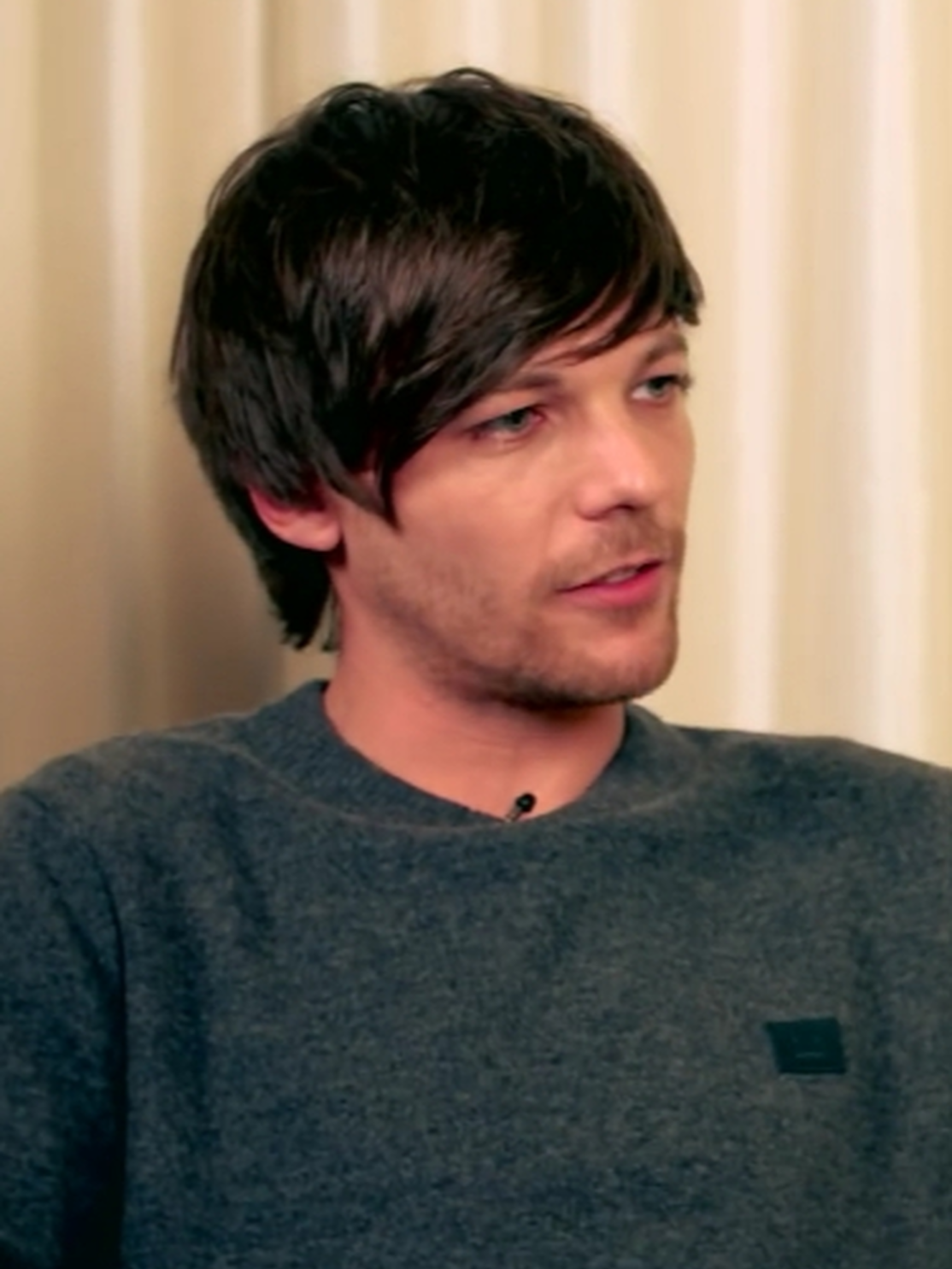
Louis Tomlinson

Journalists compared "Phan" to other conspiracy theories including "Gaylor" and "Larry Stylinson".

Writing for The Guardian, Eilish Gilligan described Are Dan and Phil in a Relationship? The Truth as a "revelatory moment" and a reminder of the "emotional damage that toxic fandoms can wreak on their subjects". Gilligan compared the behaviour of the Dan and Phil fandom to stan culture, comparing the speculation about the pair's relationship with the Gaylor conspiracy theory, in which fans scrutinise Taylor Swift's songs and interviews for supposed evidence that she is secretly a lesbian.

Mashable's Chase DiBenedetto described the video's format as a "satirical conspiracy documentary", describing the "Phan" phenomenon as the internet's "most fervent romantic conspiracies for more than a decade", highlighting its focus on real person fiction and likening the behaviour of Dan and Phil's fandom to that of Larries, who are shippers that believe former One Direction bandmates Harry Styles and Louis Tomlinson are involved in a secret romantic relationship. DiBenedetto called it "worth every minute", highlighting their response to parasocial interactions with their fans as a "modern blueprint". The Express Tribune credited the video with putting "one of YouTube’s biggest conspiracies to rest", praising the duo's "humor, authenticity, and [...] honesty".

== Aftermath ==
Following its announcement on Are Dan and Phil in a Relationship? The Truth, the podcast Hard Launch launched on 20 October 2025, with the release of its first episode in which Howell and Lester discuss the aftermath of the video's release. On 29 June 2026, Variety revealed that the pair would embark on the Hard Launch Tour, which would take place on 65 dates across the Americas, Europe, Australia and Singapore; it also marked their first tour as a public couple. Howell described the reception to the video as "incredible", with the duo having "no idea how positive it would be". Lester described his intentions with the tour to be "as gay as possible", while creating queer safe spaces "where people can have a good time". Are Dan and Phil in a Relationship? The Truth amassed over 1.8 million views on YouTube less than 24 hours after its release.
