= Dan and Phil =

English entertainment and business duo

- Daniel Howell (left) and Phil Lester (right) in 2026
- Occupations: YouTubers; broadcasters; authors; entertainers; entrepreneurs
- Years active: 2009–present

YouTube information
- Channel: Dan and Phil
- Years active: 2014–2018, 2023–present
- Subscribers: 3.1 million
- Views: 902 million
- Last updated: 11 July 2026

Daniel Howell and Phil Lester, known together as Dan and Phil, are an English entertainment and business duo. They are best known for their collaborative work on YouTube. Additionally, they have collaborated on television and radio presenting, books, tours, and original films.

== Background ==
Daniel Howell and Phil Lester met on the internet in 2009 and in person that October. They have lived together since August 2011, first in Manchester before moving to London in July 2012. At the end of 2020, they announced they bought a home together, where they currently reside.

=== Personal relationship ===
In June 2019, Howell came out as gay via a YouTube video on his channel. Lester followed suit by posting a coming-out video to his own channel later that month. In Howell's video, he shared that the pair had been romantically involved at the beginning of their relationship, but refrained from clarifying its status at the time out of respect for his and Lester's privacy. In October 2025, Howell and Lester confirmed that they had been in a romantic relationship since meeting in 2009, in a video titled Are Dan and Phil in a Relationship? The Truth. Prior to coming out, their relationship was subject to shipping and speculation for many years.

== YouTube ==
Lester uploaded his first video on his channel, AmazingPhil, in March 2006. Howell initially found Lester through YouTube and was a fan of his videos. After messaging with Lester online, Howell posted his first video to his YouTube channel, at the time called danisnotonfire, in October 2009. Later that month, Dan and Phil met in person and created their first collaboration, a Q&A video titled "phil is not on fire", posted to Lester's channel. The video sparked what would become a ten-part series, with one installment uploaded a year until the last one in 2018. Since 2009, Dan and Phil have frequently appeared in videos on each other's channels.

=== Dan and Phil (formerly DanAndPhilGAMES) ===
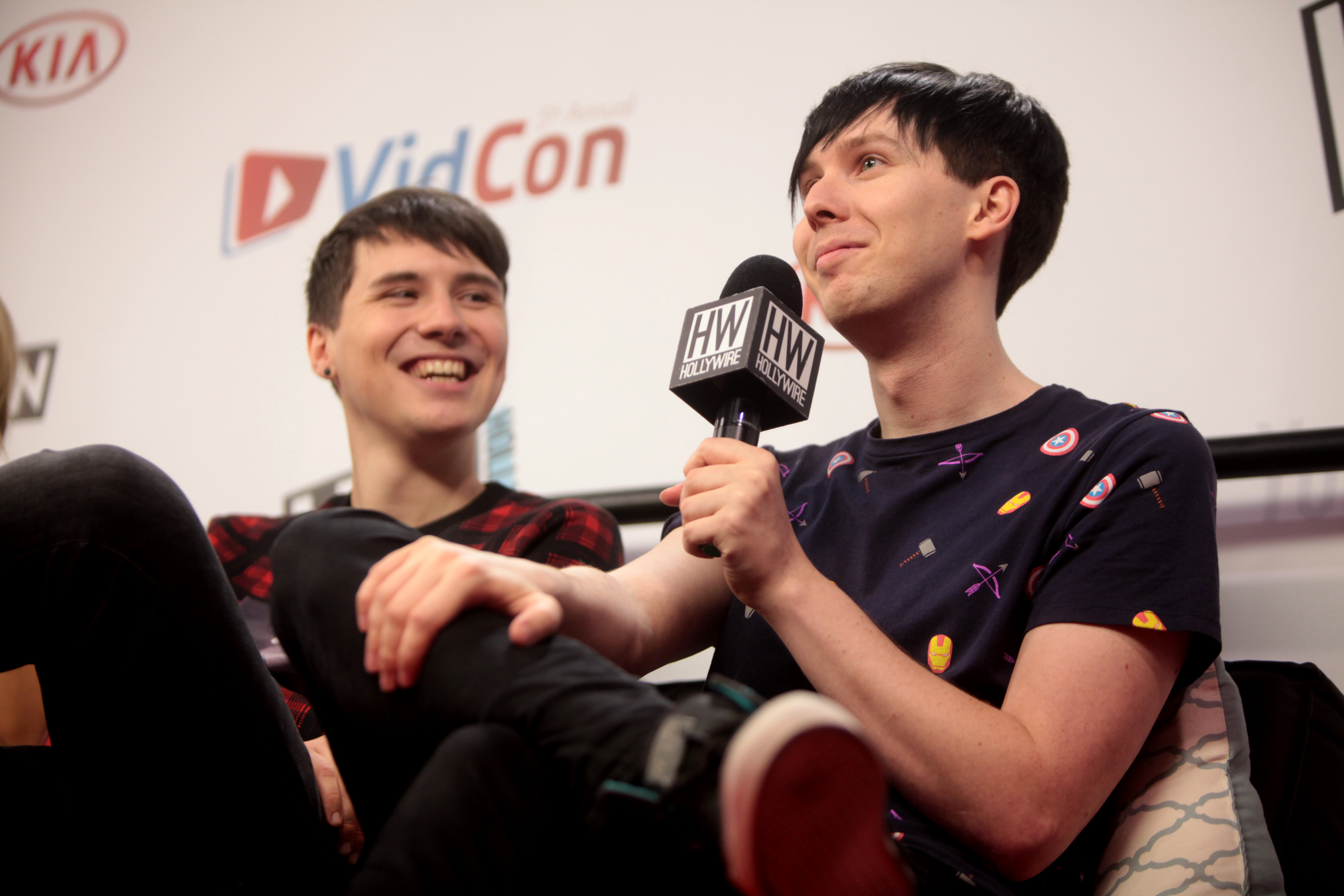
Dan and Phil speaking at VidCon 2014

On 12 September 2014, Dan and Phil posted the first video on their joint gaming YouTube channel, DanAndPhilGAMES. On 8 March 2015 the channel hit 1 million subscribers. At the time, it was the fastest growing channel on YouTube. The channel reached over 3.1 million subscribers. The channel features Dan and Phil playing a variety of games. Some of the most popular series on the channel include the pair's Sims 4 Let's Play and "Gamingmas", an annual series where the duo uploaded videos to the channel every day in December until Christmas.

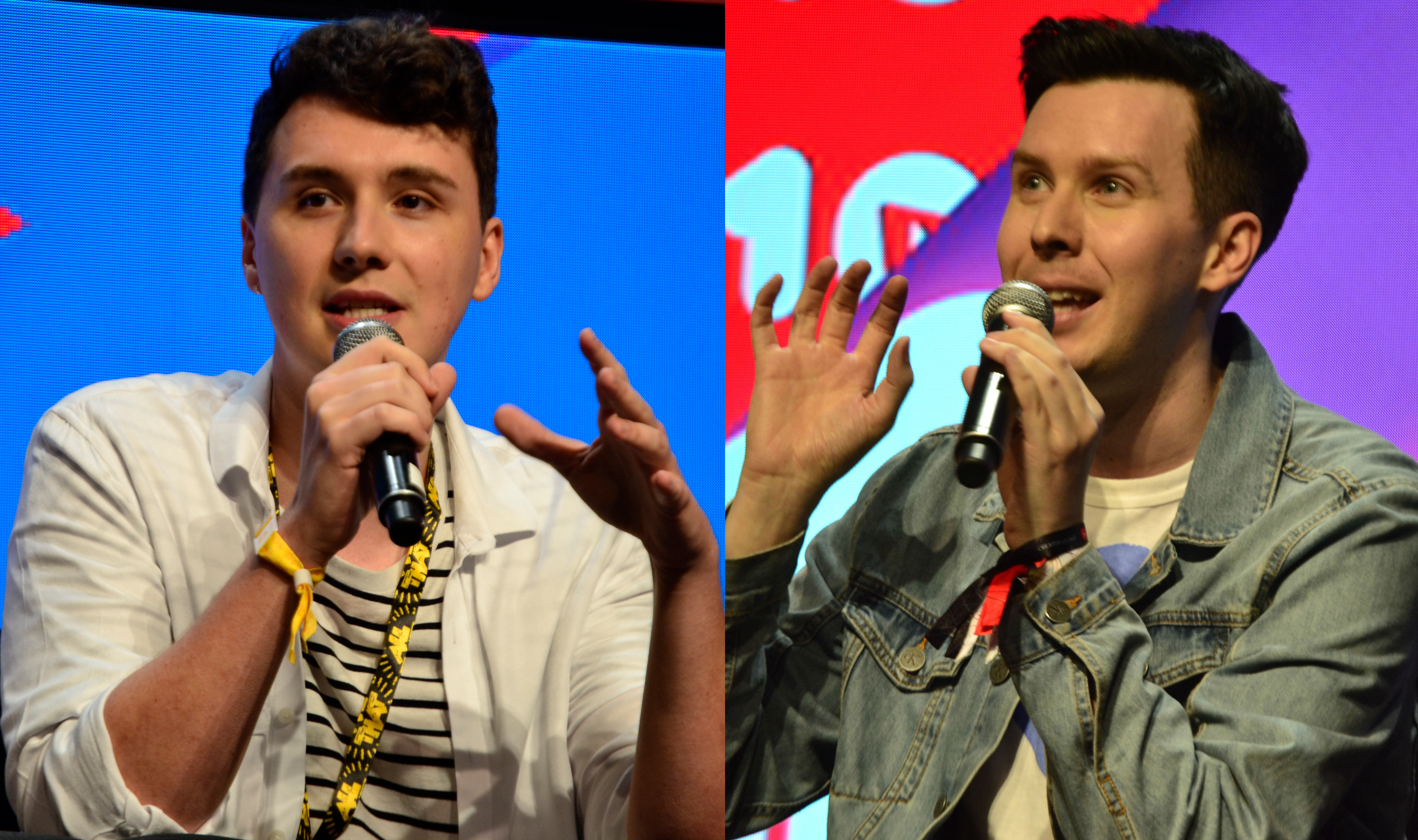
Howell and Lester at Vidcon in 2019

In December 2018, the channel went on an indefinite hiatus. On 15 October 2023, Dan and Phil announced that they would both return to making videos on the channel in a video titled "Saying Goodbye Forever", directed by PJ Liguori and guest starring Jacksepticeye. In February 2024, they commissioned Lowave Records for a custom lo-fi and synthwave-inspired soundtrack for the channel, released as an album titled All or Nothing under the artist name DanAndPhilBEATS. In continued partnership with Lowave Records, they released four additional albums in 2024.

For Lester's birthday in January 2024, the pair hosted a two-hour charity livestream on the channel, through which they raised over $100,000 for the Palestine Children's Relief Fund. They hosted another livestream for Howell's birthday in June 2024 for the same charity, which also raised over $100,000.

On 13 October 2025, the DanAndPhilGAMES channel was rebranded to Dan and Phil.

=== Other YouTube projects ===
==== The Super Amazing Project ====
In October 2011, Dan and Phil were invited to create a collaborative YouTube channel by the network My Damn Channel. Titled The Super Amazing Project, it featured the duo discussing and investigating paranormal events. Segments included "Viewers Spooky Happenings", where the audience of the show would send in "scary" items for the video bloggers to react to, and "In The News This Week", where the duo recapped recent light-hearted news items and viral videos. Dan and Phil hosted three seasons of The Super Amazing Project through December 2012.

==== DanAndPhilCRAFTS ====
On 1 April 2015, Dan and Phil launched a spin-off crafts-based channel, DanAndPhilCRAFTS, as an April Fools joke. It featured a single video of them creating square snowflakes out of paper, with an amateur editing style and humour throughout. It reached over 154,000 subscribers and 500,000 total video views in one week. Additional videos were uploaded on April Fools' Day in 2016, 2017, and 2024.

== Radio ==
In November 2012, the BBC announced that from January 2013 onwards, Dan and Phil would present the Sunday night entertainment and request show for national UK radio station BBC Radio 1. The duo had occasionally worked with Radio 1 before, making videos for the station's YouTube channel and presenting two Christmas broadcasts.

The eponymous show was designed to be an interactive, audio-visual broadcast involving music videos made by viewers, physical challenges performed on air by Dan and Phil, and song requests from listeners. It was streamed in a video, live on the BBC Radio 1 website, and accessible worldwide.

In August 2014, it was announced that the last Dan and Phil show would be broadcast at the end of the month, with the duo moving to a new show on Monday nights. The show, The Internet Takeover, featured Dan and Phil once a month, with other popular video bloggers presenting the rest of the time. The show ended in April 2016.

== Tours and books ==
=== The Amazing Tour Is Not on Fire and related books ===
In March 2015, via a trailer on Howell's channel, Dan and Phil announced a theatrical stage show, The Amazing Tour Is Not on Fire. The show was based on the premise of Howell and Lester's Internet lives coming to life. The tour began in the United Kingdom in October 2015, before traveling to the United States, Australia, and Europe in 2016. At the time, it was the largest tour ever achieved by YouTube creators. The title comes from Lester's YouTube channel name, AmazingPhil, and Howell's YouTube channel name at the time, danisnotonfire. In the same trailer, the pair announced that they had co-written a book titled The Amazing Book Is Not on Fire. The book featured elements of their online content and behind-the-scenes stories. It was released in October 2015, published by Ebury Press and Random House Children's Books. The book topped the General Hardbacks Sunday Times Bestsellers list and became a #1 New York Times Bestseller on the young adult hardcover list.

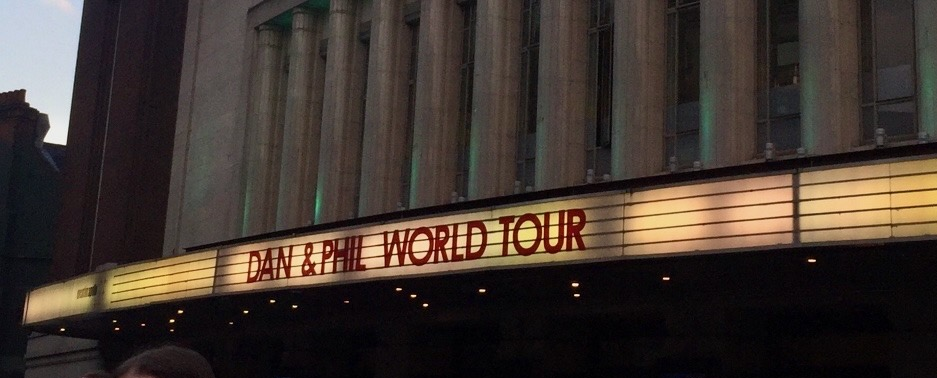
A sign for the Interactive Introverts tour outside the Hammersmith Apollo in May 2018

In October 2016, a recording of The Amazing Tour Is Not on Fire was released as a YouTube Red original film. A behind-the-scenes documentary about the tour, Dan and Phil's Story of TATINOF, was released alongside the tour film. Dan and Phil were the first British creators to release content on the YouTube Red platform. In November 2016, Dan and Phil released a photo book, Dan and Phil Go Outside, which featured a collection of photos and stories from Dan and Phil's travels and tour. The book became a #1 New York Times bestseller.

=== Interactive Introverts ===
In November 2017, Dan and Phil announced their second tour, Interactive Introverts. The tour took place in 2018. It included 80 shows in 18 countries, making it one of the biggest YouTuber tours of all time. Dan and Phil partnered with BBC Studios' TalentWorks to release a tour film of Interactive Introverts with bonus features, such as behind-the-scenes content and directors' commentary, in December 2018.

=== Terrible Influence ===
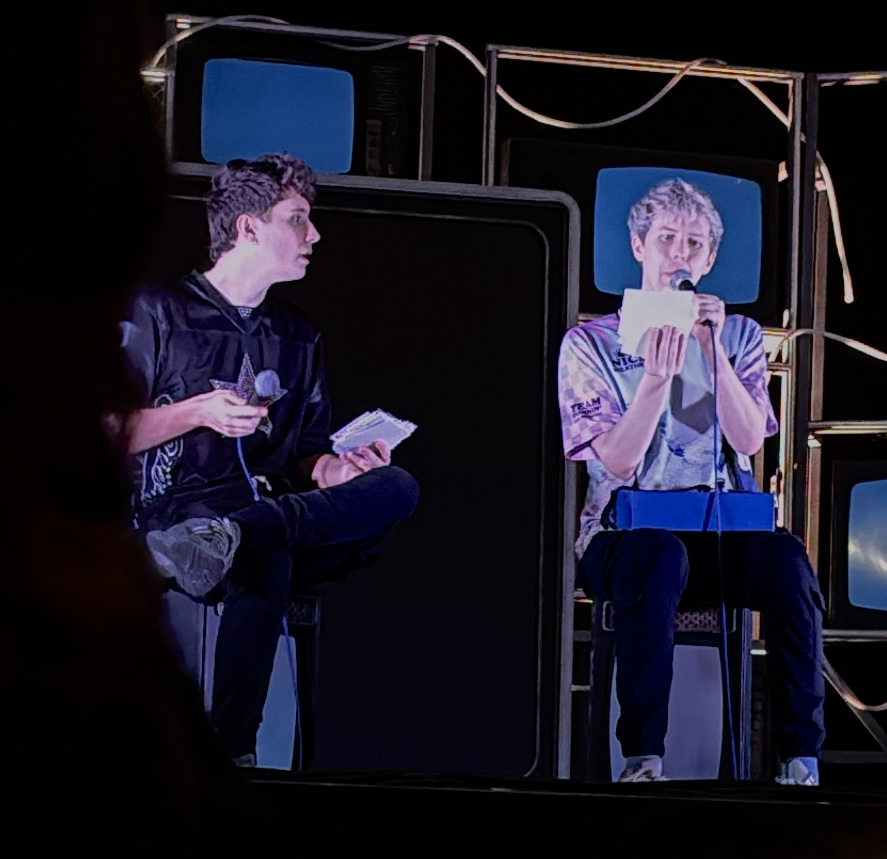
Dan and Phil on stage during a Terrible Influence pre-show Q&A in 2025.

In June 2024, Dan and Phil announced their third joint tour, Terrible Influence. The tour took place from 2024 to 2025. In total, the show had over 70 performances.

The show explored Dan and Phil's history and their relationship with their audience. It marked the pair's first major project together since returning to their joint YouTube channel in October 2023. Howell described the show as "rising from the ashes."

=== Hard Launch World Tour ===
In June 2026, Dan and Phil announced their fourth tour, the Hard Launch World Tour, set to begin in the fall of 2026, with 65 dates in total. Howell named it "a special first experience" in the tour announcement. The title of the show comes from their podcast, Hard Launch.

== Podcast ==
Hard Launch with Dan and Phil
- Genre: Comedy
- Format: Audio; video
- Country of origin: United Kingdom
- Language: English

Cast and voices
- Hosted by: Daniel Howell and Phil Lester

Music
- Opening theme: "Hard Monday" by DanAndPhilBEATS and Lowave Records

Production
- Production: Emilia Wheatley, Leila Al-Mitwally, Studio71
- Editing: Phill Deacon, Cassidy Rebelo
- Length: 36–49 minutes

Technical specifications
- Video format: YouTube; Patreon (extra segments)

Publication
- Original release: 20 October 2025
- Updates: Weekly on Mondays

Related
- Website: Official playlist

Following the rebrand of their shared YouTube channel in October 2025, Howell and Lester began hosting a weekly comedy podcast called Hard Launch with Dan and Phil. The first episode premiered on 20 October 2025. Each episode includes a companion video version available on their YouTube channel. Hard Launch with Dan and Phil is produced by Studio71. Extra 15-minute segments for each podcast episode are available for paid members on Patreon.

Hard Launch won the publicly-voted Listeners' Choice Award at the British Podcast Awards in October 2026.

== Business ventures ==
=== IRL Merch ===
In 2014, Dan and Phil founded IRL Digital, Ltd, along with Lester's brother, Martyn. The company creates and sells the merchandise of various media personalities.

=== Games ===
In August 2015, Dan and Phil created an app, The 7 Second Challenge, based on a YouTube challenge of the same name started by Lester in a 2014 video posted to AmazingPhil. The app was discontinued in 2019. In October 2017, the duo released a party board game, Truth Bombs, via game company Big Potato. The board game was based on an icebreaker that Lester had invented. Big Potato later released a Mean Girls-themed version of Truth Bombs titled Mean Girls: The Party Game.

== Filmography ==
=== Television ===
Year	Title	Role	Notes	Ref.
2012	Becoming YouTube	Themselves	Web series; episode: "Anatomy of a YouTuber"	
2013	Friday Download	Themselves	Episode: "Eliza Doolittle, Dan Howell & Phil Lester"	
2014–2016	BRIT Awards	Presenters	Presenters for online livestreams only	
2015	Oscar's Hotel for Fantastical Creatures	Brie and Rash	Web series	
2016	The Lion Guard	Majinuni and Hafifu	Episode: "The Lost Gorillas"	

=== Film ===
Year	Title	Role	Notes	Ref.
2015	Big Hero 6	Technician 1 and Technician 2	Cameo; UK theatrical release only	
2016	The Amazing Tour Is Not on Fire	Themselves	Tour film	
2016	Dan and Phil's Story of TATINOF	Themselves		
2018	Interactive Introverts	Themselves	Tour film	

== Reception ==
In 2016, Dan and Phil were ranked amongst Britain's 500 most influential people by The Sunday Times.

A 2024 YouGov survey asked young LGBTQ+ Britons (16–25) which public figures made a "positive impression" on them growing up in terms of making them feel more comfortable and less alone in their identities. Though the list was "long and widely varied," Dan and Phil came second and fourth respectively.

In 2026, Dan and Phil were named among the Mashable 101, Mashable's list of top creators.

=== Awards and nominations ===
Year	Show	Award	Nominee	Result	Ref
2013	Sony Awards	Golden Headphones Award	Dan and Phil on BBC Radio 1	Won	
2014	Teen Choice Awards	Web Collaboration	The Photo Booth Challenge	Nominated	
2016	Shorty Awards	Best YouTube Ensemble	Dan and Phil	Nominated	
2016	Summer in the City Awards	YouTuber Book of the Year	The Amazing Book is Not on Fire	Won	
2016	British Online Creator Awards	Collaboration of the Year	Phil is not on fire 7	Won	
2016	British Online Creator Awards	Film of the Year	The Amazing Tour Is Not on Fire – Official Movie	Won	
2016	British Online Creator Awards	Film of the Year	Dan & Phil's Story of TATINOF	Nominated	
2016	British Online Creator Awards	Travel Video of the Year	A Day in the Life of Dan and Phil in AUSTRALIA!	Nominated	
2017	Summer in the City Awards	Creator Book of the Year	Dan and Phil Go Outside	Nominated	
2026	British Podcast Awards	Listeners' Choice Award	Hard Launch with Dan and Phil	Won	
