= Interactive Introverts =

Second stage show and world tour by YouTubers Dan & Phil

- Tour by Dan and Phil
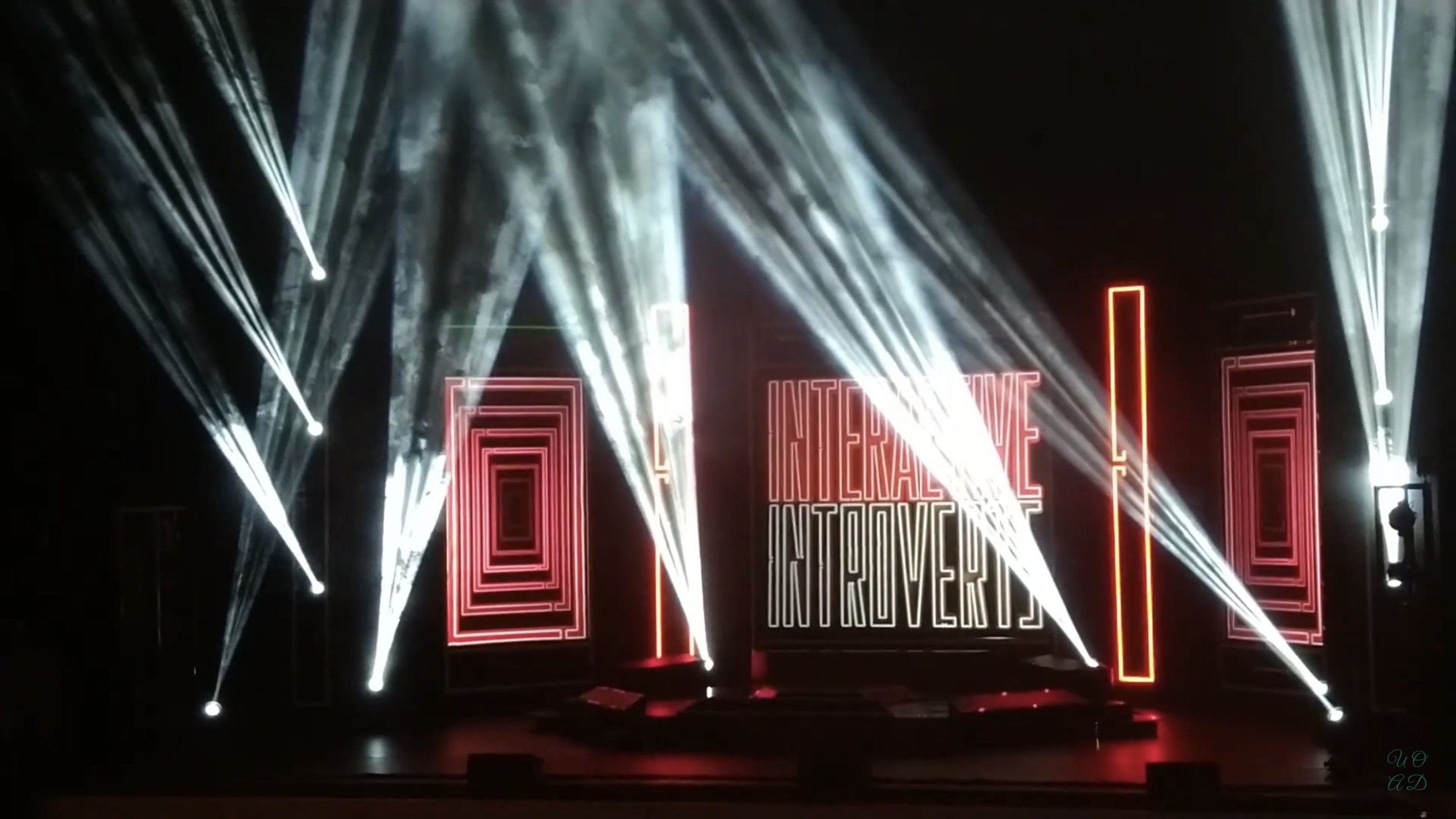
- Set design
- Start date: 28 April 2018
- End date: 21 September 2018
- No. of shows: 82 total; 24 in the UK & Ireland, 11 in mainland Europe, 37 in North America, 6 in Oceania, 4 in Asia

Dan and Phil concert chronology
- The Amazing Tour Is Not On Fire (2015–2016); Interactive Introverts (2018); Terrible Influence (2024–2025)

Interactive Introverts was the second stage show and world tour by YouTubers Dan and Phil (Daniel Howell and Phil Lester) that took place in 2018 and the duo's last major collaborative project at the time before going on a temporary hiatus. The tour ran from April, starting in Brighton, to September, ending in Mumbai, and included over 80 shows in 18 countries, including but not limited to Poland, the Philippines, Russia, New Zealand, Finland, and the Netherlands, making it one of the biggest and most international YouTuber tours of all time.

== Development ==
Howell and Lester planned in early 2017 to embark on a world tour with the intention of visiting parts of the world they had not been able to visit before, such as much of Europe, Asia, and South America. Unlike their first tour, the legs of which were spread out across 2015 and 2016, Howell and Lester made a point of completing this tour in one go with legs back to back, starting in April and ending in September 2018.

The tour was announced in November 2017 with a teaser on Howell's channel, followed by a trailer in June 2018 in addition to various promotional and behind the scenes content across their channels and social media. The premise for this tour was less theatrical than their first tour, which used a fictional storyline as a framing device, and more based on audience interaction, with the tagline "Giving the people what they want".

== Film ==
Dan and Phil partnered with BBC Studios' TalentWorks to release a movie of Interactive Introverts with bonus features, such as behind the scenes content and director's commentary, on DVD, Blu-ray, and available for digital download in December 2018.

To make up for the Brazil date that had not worked out in the original schedule, Howell and Lester premiered their film at the Teatro Opus in São Paulo in November 2018 with a live Q&A session and a meet and greet. A Twitter-based watch party for the film took place in January 2019.

== Tour dates ==
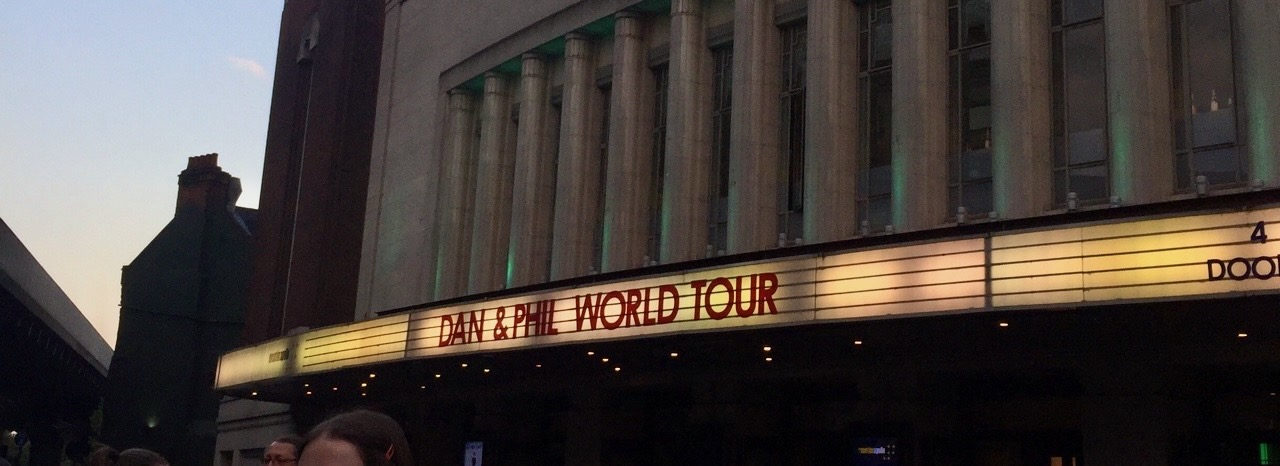
Sign outside the Hammersmith Apollo in May 2018

Date	City	Country	Venue
UK & Ireland
28 April 2018 Matinee	Brighton	England	Brighton Dome
28 April Evening	Brighton	England	Brighton Dome
30 April	Milton Keynes	England	Milton Keynes Theatre
1 May	Milton Keynes	England	Milton Keynes Theatre
2 May	Nottingham	England	Nottingham Royal Concert Hall
4 May	London	England	Hammersmith Apollo
6 May	Glasgow	Scotland	SEC Armadillo
7 May	Sheffield	England	Sheffield City Hall
8 May	Newcastle	England	Sage Gateshead
9 May	Newcastle	England	Sage Gateshead
12 May Matinee	Edinburgh	Scotland	Usher Hall
12 May Evening	Edinburgh	Scotland	Usher Hall
13 May Matinee	Liverpool	England	Liverpool Empire Theatre
13 May Evening	Liverpool	England	Liverpool Empire Theatre
14 May	Salford	England	The Lowry
15 May	Salford	England	The Lowry
17 May	Basingstoke	England	The Anvil
18 May	Plymouth	England	Plymouth Pavilions
20 May	Leeds	England	Leeds Town Hall
22 May	Birmingham	England	Symphony Hall
25 May	Cardiff	Wales	Motorpoint Arena
28 May	Belfast	Northern Ireland	Waterfront Hall
29 May	Dublin	Ireland	Olympia Theatre
30 May	Dublin	Ireland	Olympia Theatre
Mainland Europe
2 June Matinee	Amsterdam	Netherlands	RAI Amsterdam Convention Centre
2 June Evening	Amsterdam	Netherlands	RAI Amsterdam Convention Centre
5 June	Moscow	Russia	Vegas City Hall
6 June	Moscow	Russia	Vegas City Hall
9 June	Berlin	Germany	Tempodrom
11 June Matinee	Warsaw	Poland	Palladium
11 June Evening	Warsaw	Poland	Palladium
13 June	Helsinki	Finland	The House of Culture
16 June Matinee	Stockholm	Sweden	Stockholm Waterfront
16 June Evening	Stockholm	Sweden	Stockholm Waterfront
17 June	Malmö	Sweden	Malmö Live
North America
26 June	Upper Darby Township (Note: Promoted as Philadelphia)	United States	The Tower Theater
29 June	Denver	United States	Bellco Theatre
1 July	Grand Prairie	United States	The Theatre at Grand Prairie
2 July	Cedar Park	United States	H-E-B Center at Cedar Park
3 July	Sugar Land	United States	Smart Financial Centre
5 July	St. Augustine	United States	St. Augustine Amphitheatre
6 July	Orlando	United States	Dr. Phillips Center for the Performing Arts
7 July	Clearwater	United States	Ruth Eckerd Hall
8 July	Fort Lauderdale	United States	Broward Center for the Performing Arts
10 July	Augusta	United States	William B. Bell Auditorium
11 July	Greensboro	United States	White Oak Amphitheatre
12 July	Richmond	United States	Altria Theater
13 July	Reading	United States	Santander Arena
14 July	Newark	United States	New Jersey Performing Arts Center
15 July	Uniondale	United States	NYCB Live
17 July	Toronto	Canada	Sony Centre for the Performing Arts
19 July	Hartford	United States	The Bushnell Center for the Performing Arts
20 July	Providence	United States	Providence Performing Arts Center
21 July	Schenectady	United States	Proctor's Theatre
22 July	Pittsburgh	United States	Heinz Hall for the Performing Arts
24 July	Detroit	United States	Fox Theatre
25 July	Rosemont	United States	Rosemont Theatre
26 July	Minneapolis	United States	Orpheum Theatre
27 July	Milwaukee	United States	Miller High Life Theatre
28 July	Cincinnati	United States	Aronoff Center
29 July	St. Louis	United States	Fox Theatre
31 July	Cleveland	United States	Connor Palace
1 August	Columbus	United States	Schottenstein Center
2 August	Louisville	United States	The Kentucky Center
3 August	Nashville	United States	Tennessee Performing Arts Center
4 August	Atlanta	United States	Fox Theatre
7 August	Phoenix	United States	Comerica Theater
8 August	San Diego	United States	San Diego Civic Theatre
9 August	Los Angeles	United States	Microsoft Theater
11 August Matinee	Seattle	United States	Moore Theatre
11 August Evening	Seattle	United States	Moore Theatre
12 August	Vancouver	Canada	Queen Elizabeth Theatre
Oceania
19 August	Melbourne	Australia	Melbourne Convention and Exhibition Centre
22 August	Brisbane	Australia	Queensland Performing Arts Centre
23 August	Brisbane	Australia	Queensland Performing Arts Centre
29 August	Auckland	New Zealand	ASB Theatre
2 September	Sydney	Australia	State Theatre
3 September	Sydney	Australia	State Theatre
Asia
13 September	Quezon City	Philippines	Kia Theater
15 September	Singapore	Singapore	Kallang Theatre
18 September	Hong Kong		MacPherson Stadium
21 September	Mumbai	India	Shanmukhananda Hall
Cancelled
	Montreal	Canada	
		Mexico	
Brazil
