= Daniel Howell =

English YouTuber (born 1991)

- Howell in 2026
- Born: Daniel James Howell; 11 June 1991 (age 35); Wokingham, Berkshire, England
- Education: University of Manchester (dropped out)
- Occupations: YouTuber; comedian; author; radio presenter
- Partner: Phil Lester (2009–present)

YouTube information
- Channel: Daniel Howell
- Years active: 2009–2019, 2022–present
- Subscribers: 6.04 million
- Views: 703.71 million
- Last updated: 12 November 2026

Daniel James Howell (born 11 June 1991) is an English YouTuber, presenter, comedian and author. He gained prominence through his YouTube channels Daniel Howell (formerly known as danisnotonfire), which has over 6.04 million subscribers (as of May 2026), and Dan and Phil (formerly DanAndPhilGAMES). He is known for his frequent collaborations with his partner Phil Lester as part of the entertainment duo Dan and Phil. Together, they presented the Sunday night entertainment show Dan and Phil on BBC Radio 1 from January 2013 until August 2014, and the station's Internet Takeover slot from September 2014 until April 2016.

== Early life ==
Daniel James Howell was born on 11 June 1991 in Wokingham, Berkshire. He grew up in Winnersh. He has a younger brother, Adrian. Howell was initially raised Protestant by his grandmother, but stopped going to church to make time for Wokingham Youth Theatre on Sundays. He attended the Forest School. Howell worked for the retail chain Focus DIY at the age of 16 and later for the supermarket Asda. After completing school in 2009, Howell took a gap year, during which he started uploading videos to his channel as a hobby. He enrolled at the University of Manchester in 2010 to study law, but dropped out in 2011 due to a lack of interest in the subject, instead pursuing YouTube and radio as a full-time profession.

== Career ==
=== YouTube ===
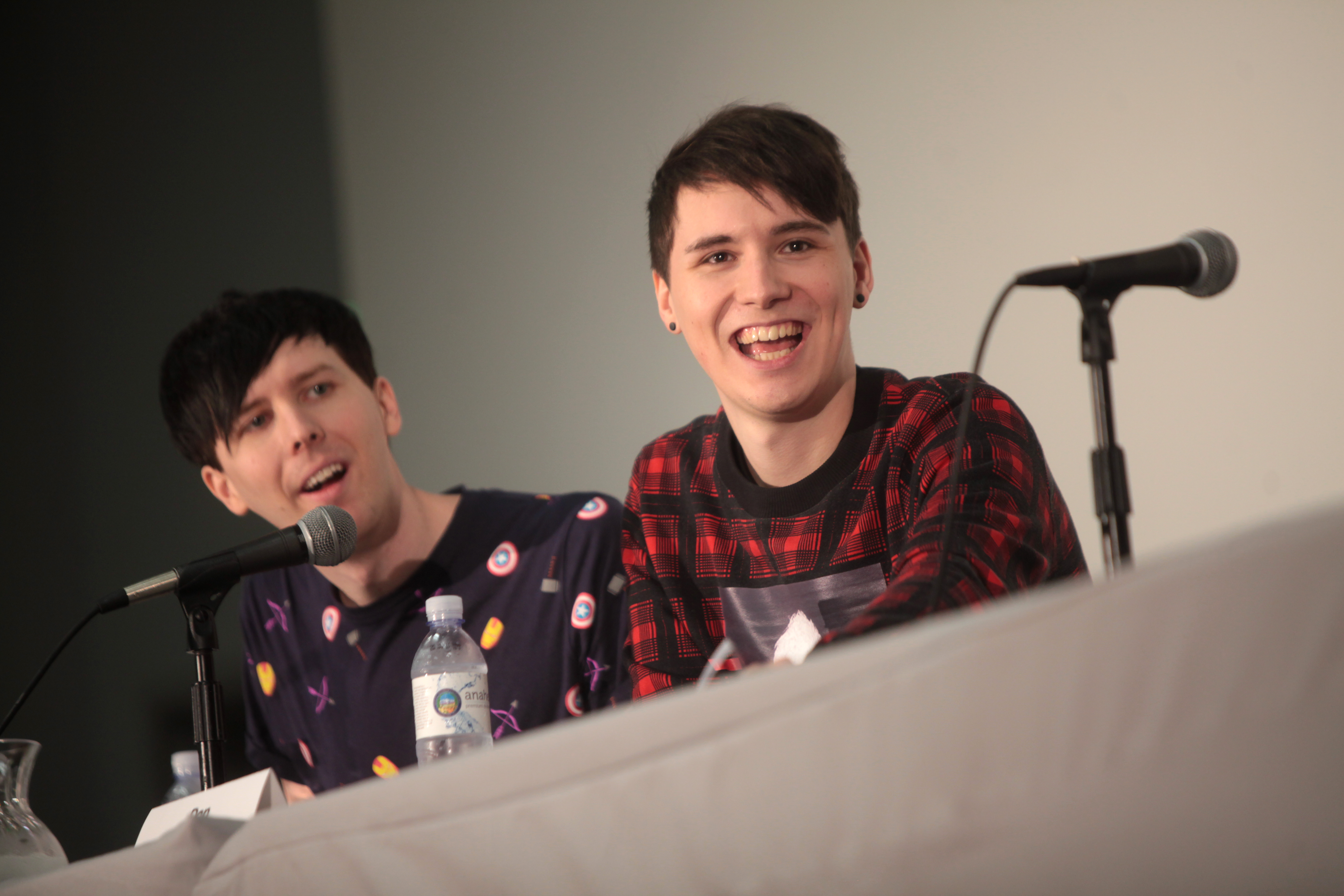
Lester and Howell at VidCon 2014

Howell uploaded his first YouTube video titled "HELLO INTERNET" on 16 October 2009. He was encouraged by "some friends" including Phil Lester to regularly upload videos to the platform. Howell gained prominence on his main channel through anecdotal storytelling. Series included Reasons Why Dan's a Fail and Internet Support Group.

He also has a second YouTube channel, danisnotinteresting, which has over 1.6 million subscribers and 57 million views, as of November 2025. Between 2013 and 2018, Howell broadcast weekly hour-long live shows on YouNow, which, from 2017, were also broadcast to danisnotinteresting.

Howell and Lester collaborated on a YouTube channel for digital entertainment company My Damn Channel, entitled The Super Amazing Project, in which they investigated paranormal events. In October 2014, the duo announced they would be ending that project to concentrate on their Radio 1 show.

In 2012, Howell won the YouTube competition "SuperNote" run by Rhett and Link. He featured in the weekly video series Becoming YouTube by Benjamin Cook, which explored the phenomenon of internet celebrity. He also wrote a blog for The Huffington Post about the creative process behind his videos.

On 1 May 2017, Howell posted a video on his channel announcing that he had changed the name of his YouTube channel from danisnotonfire to Daniel Howell as he felt the former no longer represented him, particularly in professional contexts.

From 2019 to 2022, Howell took a hiatus from his YouTube channel, making only a handful of public appearances. These included an NHS Charities Together livestream in April 2020; announcing he had bought a home with Lester in December 2020 via Stereo (the video of which was uploaded in January 2021); as well as the YouTube Originals Gay and Not Proud and Hometown Showdown in 2021. Howell explained the break in a May 2022 YouTube video titled "Why I Quit YouTube". Alongside his subsequent solo tour We're All Doomed!, Howell began a YouTube series called Dystopia Daily, which ran from 2022 to 2023.

==== Dan and Phil (formerly DanAndPhilGAMES) ====
On 12 September 2014, Howell and Lester posted the first video to their gaming YouTube channel, DanAndPhilGAMES. It was, for a time, the fastest growing channel on YouTube. As of December 2023, it had amassed 2.8 million subscribers.

Popular recurring series on this channel include their Sims 4 series, Golf with Friends, Spooky Week, and Gamingmas. The channel was on hiatus from December 2018 to October 2023.

The 2023 revival of DanAndPhilGAMES was introduced with a comedy sketch written by Howell, "Saying Goodbye Forever", which depicted an interrupted funeral for the channel and featured Jacksepticeye in a cameo role. They were among several YouTubers popular in the earlier days of the platform to return to it that year.

Following the rebrand of the channel to simply Dan and Phil in October 2025, Howell and Lester began hosting a weekly podcast called Hard Launch with Dan and Phil. Each episode includes a companion video version available on their YouTube channel and on Patreon. Hard Launch won the publicly-voted Listeners' Choice Award at the British Podcast Awards in October 2026.

==== DanAndPhilCRAFTS ====
On 1 April 2015, Howell and Lester launched a spin-off channel DanAndPhilCRAFTS as an April Fools joke. It featured a single video of them creating square snowflakes out of paper, with an amateur editing style and humour throughout. It reached over 154,000 subscribers and 500,000 total video views in one week. "Don't cry, craft" became a popular Internet meme from that video, described by the Standard-Examiner as "one of the best known YouTube phrases of all time". The channel was awarded the YouTube Silver Play Button at Summer in the City 2015.

On 1 April 2016, Howell and Lester uploaded a second joke tutorial to that channel, featuring the duo making glitter faces. On 1 April 2017, a third video titled "Potato Prints" was uploaded. On 1 April 2024, the channel returned with the video "Slime", which emphasised the horror aspects present in the previous April Fools tutorials.

=== Radio ===
In January 2013, Howell and Lester became the presenters of BBC Radio 1's Sunday evening entertainment and request show. They had occasionally worked with the station before, producing videos for the station's YouTube channel for the Edinburgh Festival Fringe and presenting two Christmas broadcasts. The show was designed to be interactive with the audience, featuring amateur music videos from listeners, challenges performed on air by the presenters, and song requests. Four months into the show's run, it won the Sony Golden Headphones award.

Howell and Lester presented online content for the station's Teen Awards in 2013 and 2014.

In August 2014, it was announced that the last Dan and Phil show would be broadcast on 24 August, with the duo moving to a different show on Monday nights also featuring other popular video bloggers. The new show, The Internet Takeover, featured Howell and Lester live on the first Monday of every month. It ended in April 2016.

=== Television and film ===
In 2013, Lester and Howell appeared on Friday Download, a BAFTA award-winning CBBC TV show.

From 2014 to 2016, Howell and Lester hosted content for the Brit Awards, including the global YouTube livestream of the ceremonies and backstage videos.

In 2015, Howell and Lester had voice cameo appearances in the UK cinema release of Walt Disney Animation Studios' Big Hero 6 as Technician 1 & 2. That same year, the duo guest-starred in fellow YouTuber PJ Liguori's web series Oscar's Hotel for Fantastical Creatures, voicing anthropomorphic food items Brie and Rash.

On 2 February 2016, Howell's eSports documentary The Supergamers aired on BBC Three.

In December 2016, Howell and Lester voiced gorilla princes named Majinuni and Hafifu respectively, in the episode "The Lost Gorillas" of Disney Junior's The Lion Guard.

In June 2023, Howell presented a documentary titled The Cost of Being a YouTuber: UNTOLD for Channel 4, in which he interviewed creators such as Dan Rhodes and Vikkstar.

=== Books and tours ===
==== The Amazing Book Is Not on Fire and The Amazing Tour Is Not on Fire ====
On 26 March 2015, Lester and Howell released a trailer on Howell's channel for their co-written book The Amazing Book Is Not on Fire (TABINOF). It was published in the UK on 8 October 2015, and worldwide on 15 October 2015, by Ebury Press and Random House Children's Books. The book topped the General Hardbacks Sunday Times Bestsellers list having sold 26,745 copies in the UK in the first week of its release. It also became a No. 1 New York Times Bestseller on the young adult hardcover list.

In the same trailer the pair announced their theatrical stage show The Amazing Tour Is Not on Fire (TATINOF) which toured the UK during October and November 2015, ending with a show at the London Palladium. During the tour, they performed original song "The Internet Is Here", which they later released as a charity single for Stand Up To Cancer.

In 2016, they took the tour to the US and Toronto, starting with a show in Orlando, Florida on 22 April and ending on 24 June with a show at the Dolby Theatre in Hollywood, California. It was the largest tour by YouTube creators at the time. They later toured Australia in August 2016, starting in Perth and ending in Brisbane, and finished the tour with a European leg.

==== YouTube Red Originals and Dan and Phil Go Outside ====
In October 2016, The Amazing Tour Is Not on Fire was released as a YouTube Red Original film along with a documentary, Dan and Phil's Story of TATINOF. They were the first British YouTube creators to release content on the YouTube Red platform.

Alongside these films, they released a photo book, Dan and Phil Go Outside, in November 2016, which included candid photos and stories from the tour. The book became a No. 1 New York Times bestseller.

==== Interactive Introverts ====
In November 2017, Lester and Howell announced their second tour, Interactive Introverts. The tour ran from April to September 2018 and included 80 shows in 18 countries, including but not limited to the UK, Poland, the Philippines, Russia, New Zealand, Finland, and the Netherlands, and India, making it one of the biggest YouTuber tours of all time.

Lester and Howell partnered with BBC Studios' TalentWorks to release a film of Interactive Introverts with bonus features, such as behind the scenes content and director's commentary, on DVD, Blu-ray, and digital download in December 2018.

==== You Will Get Through This Night ====
In September 2020, Howell announced his first publication without Lester, You Will Get Through This Night. Written in collaboration with psychologist Heather Bolton, the book is a "practical guide to taking control of your mental health for today, tomorrow, and the days after." It was released 18 May 2021, under the HQ and Dey Street Books imprints of HarperCollins, and became a No. 1 Sunday Times Bestseller.

==== We're All Doomed! ====
Upon his return to YouTube in May 2022, Howell announced he would embark on his first solo tour titled We're All Doomed!, beginning on 10 September 2022, at the Regent Theatre, Ipswich and wrapping up at Belfast's Waterfront Hall on 3 March 2023, traveling around the UK, Europe, US, Australia and New Zealand in between. In January 2024, Howell announced two extra dates for the tour would take place in February 2024, at Alexandra Palace Theatre, to record the film version of the show. A ticketed live premiere of the recording was streamed via Kiswe on 15 February 2024, with a pre-show event hosted by Lester and an after-show Q&A session with Howell. The full comedy show was subsequently uploaded to his YouTube channel.

==== Terrible Influence ====
In June 2024, Lester and Howell announced their third joint tour and first since the return of their gaming channel, titled Terrible Influence, which began that September in Antwerp. From there, the tour stretched from the remainder of 2024 into early 2025 with dates in mainland Europe, North America, Australia and New Zealand, and the UK and Ireland. Further UK dates were added in July 2024 due to demand.

=== Other ===
==== IRL Merch ====
In 2014, Howell co-founded IRL Digital, Ltd. with Lester's brother Martyn. The company creates and sells merchandise of various other media personalities.

==== Games ====
In August 2015, Howell and Lester created an app, The 7 Second Challenge, based on a YouTube challenge started by Lester in a 2014 video on his main channel. The app was discontinued in 2019. In October 2017, the duo released a party board game via Big Potato, Truth Bombs.

== Personal life ==
Howell is gay. He came out in June 2019 in a video uploaded to his YouTube channel. While in school, he struggled with external and internalised homophobia, to the point of attempting suicide. Prior to coming out publicly, he came out to his family via email.

Howell has been in a relationship with Phil Lester since October 2009. He met Lester through the Internet earlier that year. Prior to meeting, Howell was a fan of Lester's YouTube videos. The couple have lived in London since 2012. They kept their relationship a secret for nearly 16 years before confirming it in October 2025. Before coming out as a couple, the nature of their relationship was the matter of speculation. Speaking on the speculation, Howell stated: "[W]hat we had was the most important thing to me and I wanted to protect it, so when other people tried to grab it and drag it into the light, I felt completely violated."

=== Mental health ===
In October 2017, Howell posted a YouTube video in which he revealed that he had suffered from clinical depression. He also spoke of his journey to recovery, which involved taking antidepressants, seeing a therapist, and focusing on "basic self-care". Howell uploaded the video the day after World Mental Health Day, on which he supported #HelloYellow, a mental health campaign by YoungMinds. The UK-based charity then named Howell an ambassador. In November 2017, Howell became involved in Stop, Speak, Support, an anti-cyberbullying campaign launched by Prince William.

== Bibliography ==
- The Amazing Book Is Not on Fire (2015), co-written with Phil Lester
- Dan and Phil Go Outside (2016), co-written with Phil Lester
- You Will Get Through This Night (2021)

== Awards and nominations ==
=== Individual and other ===
Year	Show	Award	Nominee	Result	Ref.
2013	Shorty Awards	Best YouTube Star	Dan Howell	Nominated	
2014	Lovie Awards	Internet Video Person of the Year	Dan Howell	Won	
2016	British Online Creator Awards	Creator of the Year	Dan Howell	Nominated	
2016	British Online Creator Awards	Collaboration of the Year	(with Louise Pentland) Our Awkward Fancy Meal	Nominated	
2016	British Online Creator Awards	Series of the Year	Internet Support Group	Nominated	

=== With Lester ===
Year	Show	Award	Nominee	Result	Ref.
2013	Sony Awards	Golden Headphones Award	Dan and Phil on BBC Radio 1	Won	
2014	Teen Choice Awards	Web Collaboration	The Photo Booth Challenge	Nominated	
2016	Shorty Awards	Best YouTube Ensemble	Dan and Phil	Nominated	
2016	Summer in the City Awards	YouTuber Book of the Year	The Amazing Book is Not on Fire	Won	
2016	British Online Creator Awards	Film of the Year	The Amazing Tour Is Not on Fire - Official Movie	Won	
2016	British Online Creator Awards	Film of the Year	Dan & Phil's Story of TATINOF	Nominated	
2016	British Online Creator Awards	Collaboration of the Year	Phil is not on fire 7	Won	
2016	British Online Creator Awards	Best Use of Tech in a Video	The Dan and Phil 3D AUDIO EXPERIENCE	Nominated	
2017	Summer in the City Awards	Creator Book of the Year	Dan and Phil Go Outside	Nominated	
2026	British Podcast Awards	Listeners' Choice Award	Hard Launch with Dan and Phil	Won	
