= Louise Pentland =

English YouTuber, blogger and author (born 1985)

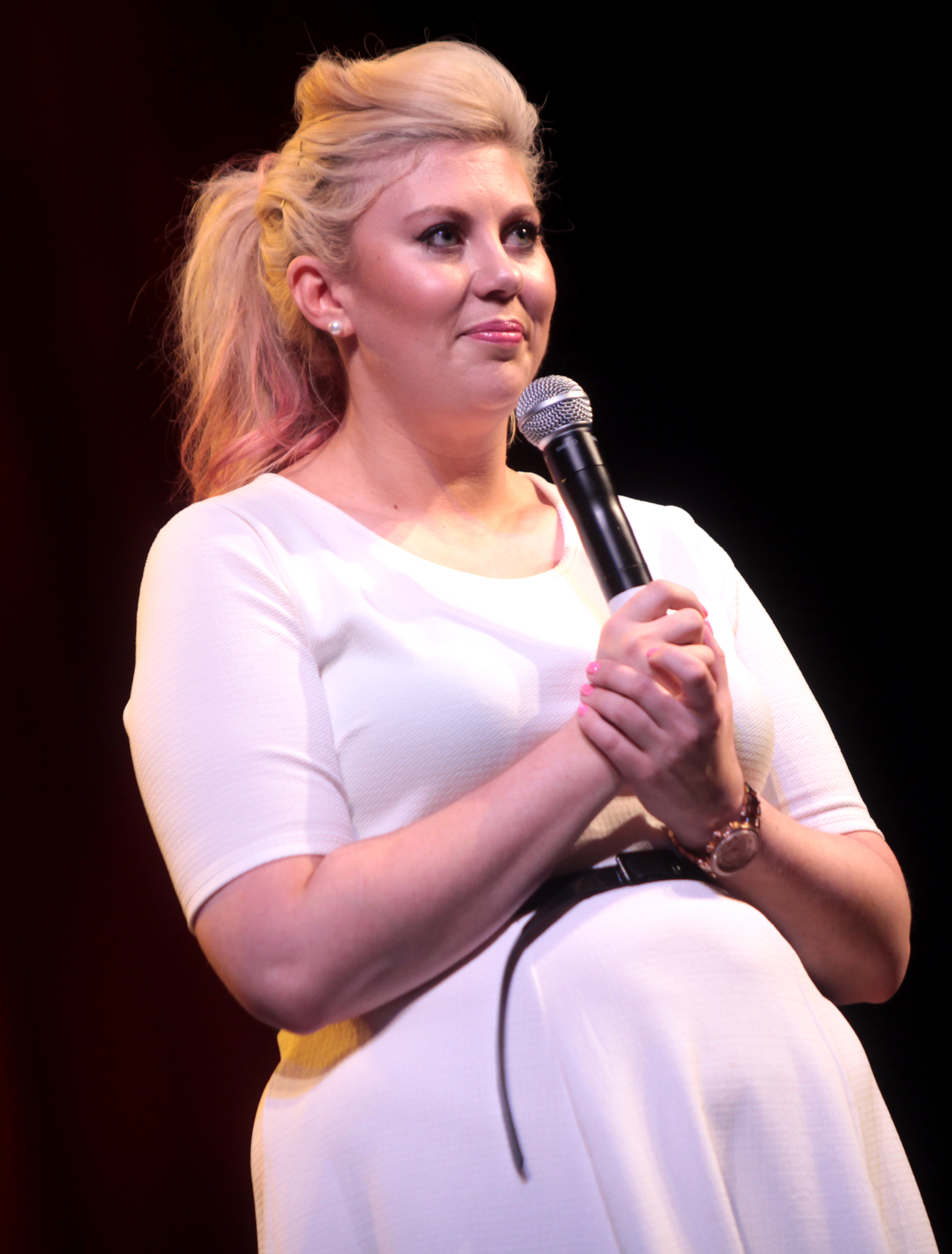
- Pentland at VidCon 2014
- Born: Louise Alexandra Pentland; 28 April 1985 (age 41); Northampton, England
- Education: Liverpool John Moores University (BS)
- Occupations: YouTuber; blogger; author
- Spouses: Matt Watson (m. 2010; div. 2015) Liam O'Neill (m. 2025)
- Children: 2

YouTube information
- Channel: Louise Pentland
- Years active: 2010–present
- Genres: Motherhood; lifestyle; vlogs
- Subscribers: 2.16 million
- Views: 196 million
- Last updated: April 8, 2026
- Website: sprinkleofglitter.blogspot.co.uk

Louise Alexandra Pentland (born 28 April 1985) is an English beauty, motherhood and lifestyle vlogger, blogger, YouTube personality and author. She is also known by her online pseudonym SprinkleofGlitter or SprinkleofChatter, although she publicly disavowed these usernames in favour of using her own name in 2016.

== Early life ==
Pentland was born and raised in Northampton. When she was seven years old, her mother died from metastatic breast cancer, which Pentland goes into detail about in her October 2015 video, "My Pink Hair Story". Her father later remarried and Pentland suffered mental and physical abuse from her stepmother. While at school at Northampton High School, Pentland experienced bullying. Pentland graduated with a Bachelor of Science with Honours in Psychology and Biology from Liverpool John Moores University in 2006.

== Career ==
Pentland was working in a number of office roles when she began writing a craft and interior DIY blog named "Sprinkle of Glitter".

Pentland began her YouTube channel, also named "Sprinkle of Glitter", in January 2010. At first the channel covered beauty, fashion and lifestyle, as well as her pregnancy; it has since expanded to include motivational and advice videos. In August 2012, Pentland began a second channel named "Sprinkle of Chatter", where she uploads lifestyle vlogs. Pentland has broadcast many collaborations on her channel with other YouTubers, including: Zoe Sugg, Joe Sugg, Alfie Deyes, Louis Cole, Tanya Burr, Tyler Oakley, Troye Sivan, Grace Helbig, Phil Lester, Daniel Howell, Caspar Lee, Jim Chapman and others.

As of August 2016 Pentland's main YouTube channel has over 2.5 million subscribers and over 150 million video views; her second channel "Sprinkle of Chatter" has over 1 million subscribers and over 85 million views. Pentland is influential in social media, with over 1 million followers on Twitter and Instagram.

Pentland has identified as a feminist and interviewed Labour Party leader Ed Miliband during the 2015 United Kingdom general election.

In 2014 she began Q&A sessions with her viewers at YouTube conventions named Glitter Time. On 2 November 2014 she performed a pilot of her LouiseLIVE stage show in Northampton, her home town, and went on to take it on tour around the UK.

On 1 September 2016, after her divorce, she announced in the blog post Why I'm 'Quitting' My Youtube Channel and the video Finishing with Sprinkle of Glitter that she will be quitting her YouTube channel as it is now, and change to something more 'adult', as she feels she has grown up a lot since the start of her channel, and it's time for something new and something she feels is more 'Louise Pentland', instead of 'SprinkleofGlitter'.

=== Published works ===
Life with a Sprinkle of Glitter was published in July 2015 by Simon & Schuster. The following month Pentland published Sprinkle of Glitter 2016 Diary: Have the Best Year of Your Life! through Faber and Faber.

Bonnier Zaffre acquired rights to two novels in 2016. The first, Wilde Like Me, was published in June 2017. The sequel, Wilde About The Girl, was published in August 2018. The third and final book in the series, Wilde Women, was published in September 2019.

In March 2020, Bonnier Books announced a three-year portfolio of books written by Pentland, including a memoir on motherhood, scheduled to be released in August 2020; in addition to an adult fiction book, to be published in 2021, and two children's books, due in 2022 and 2023, respectively.

Her novel Time After Time was published by Bonnier in 2022. It tells the story of Tabby, a vintage shop worker who feels stuck in her life and time-travels to the 1980s, meeting family members and learning about herself along the way.

=== Podcasting ===
In November 2019 Pentland announced her own podcast, Mothers' Meeting with Louise Pentland, with episodes focusing on "offering insight into the parenting styles, personal struggles, and points of view of some of Britain's best loved mums". The first episode featured Angela Scanlon and Emily Norris, and subsequent guests have included Konnie Huq, Katie Piper and Nadia Sawalha.

== Personal life ==
During her time at Liverpool John Moores University, Pentland met Matt Watson, a teacher, whom she married on 4 September 2010. They have a daughter named Darcy (born 2011). Pentland and Watson separated in mid-2014, but both stated in 2015 that they remained on good terms. Pentland is currently married to D.I Liam O'Neill, with whom she has a daughter named Pearl (born 2018). Pentland and O'Neill announced their engagement in March 2020. They married in February 2025. In early 2026, Pentland was diagnosed with autism, which she shared in a Youtube video and on a podcast with Hazel Hayes.

== Bibliography ==
Title	Series	Publication year	ISBN/ASIN
Life with a Sprinkle of Glitter		2015	1471149730
Sprinkle of Glitter 2016 Diary: Have the Best Year of Your Life!		2015	0571322670
Wilde Like Me	Robin Wilde	2017	1785762931
Wilde About the Girl	Robin Wilde	2018	1785764640
Wilde Women	Robin Wilde	2019	1785769308
MumLife: What Nobody Ever Tells You About Being a Mum		2020	1788702921
Time After Time		2022	1838774092
