= The Amazing Tour Is Not on Fire =

Book tour with YouTubers Dan and Phil

- Tour by Dan and Phil
- Start date: 8 October 2015
- End date: 6 December 2016
- Legs: 4
- No. of shows: 76 total; 17 in the UK, 44 in North America, 10 in Australia, 5 in Europe

Dan and Phil concert chronology
- The Amazing Tour Is Not on Fire (2015–2016); Interactive Introverts (2018)

The Amazing Tour Is Not on Fire, also known as TATINOF, is a quasi-fictional theatrical stage show and the first tour by YouTuber duo Dan and Phil, consisting of Daniel Howell and Phil Lester. It was performed as a companion to The Amazing Book Is Not on Fire.

The tour travelled around the United Kingdom during October and November 2015, ending with a show at the London Palladium. During the tour, Dan and Phil sang the original song "The Internet Is Here", which they later released as a charity single for Stand Up To Cancer, earning them a gold record disc for sales of the song.

In 2016, they took the tour to the US and Toronto, starting with a show in Orlando, Florida on 22 April and ended on 24 June with a show at the Dolby Theatre in Hollywood, California. It was the largest tour ever achieved by YouTube creators. They later toured Australia in August 2016, starting in Perth and ending in Brisbane, and finished the tour with a European leg, performing in Stockholm, Berlin, and Dublin.

== Story ==
Phil quite literally breaks the Internet by microwaving his laptop in an experiment, exploding its contents like popcorn. As they attempt to fix the Internet, Dan and Phil bring their YouTube content past and present to the stage, forced by circumstance to learn how to entertain their audience and live without the very thing that made them.

== Development ==
Planning began as early as 2014. Dan and Phil wrote and produced the show themselves, and then a crew helped them bring it to life. On 26 March 2015, they announced both their book and tour via a trailer on Howell's channel. A second trailer for the U.S. leg was released in February 2016.

== YouTube Red originals ==
In October 2016, a live recording of the final U.S. show at the Dolby Theatre, was released as a YouTube Red Original film of the same name along with a documentary, Dan and Phil's Story of TATINOF. They were the first British YouTube creators to release content on the YouTube Red platform.

== Dan and Phil Go Outside ==
The cover for Dan and Phil Go Outside

In November 2016, Dan and Phil released Dan and Phil Go Outside, their second book together. The book was a companion to The Amazing Tour Is Not on Fire, featuring photos and behind-the-scenes stories from their travels during the tour.

Dan and Phil Go Outside was a #1 New York Times Best Seller. Common Sense Media wrote, "This is an engaging and lively look at putting a large-scale show on tour that will delight fans of the popular British YouTubers."

== Tour dates ==
Date	City	Country	Venue
United Kingdom
8 October 2015	Glasgow	Scotland	Glasgow Royal Concert Hall
9 October 2015	Newcastle	England	Newcastle City Hall
11 October 2015 Matinee	Salford	England	The Lowry
11 October 2015 Evening	Salford	England	The Lowry
12 October 2015	Sheffield	England	Sheffield City Hall
13 October 2015	Glasgow	Scotland	Glasgow Royal Concert Hall
18 October 2015 Matinee	Leeds	England	Leeds Town Hall
18 October 2015 Evening	Leeds	England	Leeds Town Hall
20 October 2015	Plymouth	England	Plymouth Pavilions
25 October 2015 Matinee	Birmingham	England	Symphony Hall
25 October 2015 Evening	Birmingham	England	Symphony Hall
26 October 2015 Matinee	Cardiff	Wales	St David's Hall
26 October 2015 Evening	Cardiff	Wales	St David's Hall
28 October 2015	Belfast	Northern Ireland	Waterfront Hall
31 October 2015 Matinee	Brighton	England	Brighton Dome
31 October 2015 Evening	Brighton	England	Brighton Dome
3 November 2015	Nottingham	England	Nottingham Royal Concert Hall
5 November 2015	Liverpool	England	Liverpool Empire Theatre
8 November 2015 Matinee	London	England	London Palladium
8 November 2015 Evening	London	England	London Palladium
10 November 2015	Basingstoke	England	The Anvil
12 November 2015	Folkestone	England	Leas Cliff Hall
15 November 2015 Matinee	London	England	London Palladium
15 November 2015 Evening	London	England	London Palladium
North America
22 April 2016 Matinee	Orlando	United States	Playlist Live
22 April 2016 Evening	Orlando	United States	Playlist Live
25 April 2016	Jacksonville	United States	Times-Union Center for the Performing Arts
26 April 2016	Fort Lauderdale	United States	Broward Center for the Performing Arts
27 April 2016	Clearwater	United States	Ruth Eckerd Hall
29 April 2016	Atlanta	United States	Fox Theatre
1 May 2016	Reading	United States	Santander Arena
2 May 2016	New York City	United States	Beacon Theatre
3 May 2016	New York City	United States	Beacon Theatre
5 May 2016	Boston	United States	Wang Theatre
7 May 2016	Toronto	Canada	Sony Centre for the Performing Arts
8 May 2016	Toronto	Canada	Sony Centre for the Performing Arts
10 May 2016	Detroit	United States	Fox Theatre
11 May 2016	Kalamazoo	United States	Miller Auditorium
12 May 2016	Akron	United States	E. J. Thomas Hall
14 May 2016	Louisville	United States	The Kentucky Center
15 May 2016	Columbus	United States	Palace Theatre
17 May 2016	Charlotte	United States	Belk Theater
18 May 2016	Durham	United States	Durham Performing Arts Center
20 May 2016	Philadelphia	United States	Kimmel Center for the Performing Arts
21 May 2016	Baltimore	United States	Lyric Opera House
22 May 2016	Washington, D.C.	United States	Warner Theatre
24 May 2016	Nashville	United States	Tennessee Performing Arts Center
25 May 2016	Indianapolis	United States	Murat Theater
26 May 2016	Des Moines	United States	Civic Center of Greater Des Moines
27 May 2016	Chicago	United States	Chicago Theatre
28 May 2016	Chicago	United States	Chicago Theatre
29 May 2016	Milwaukee	United States	Milwaukee Theatre
1 June 2016	Minneapolis	United States	Orpheum Theatre
2 June 2016	Kansas City	United States	Arvest Bank Theatre
3 June 2016	St. Louis	United States	Peabody Opera House
5 June 2016	Denver	United States	Bellco Theatre
8 June 2016	Houston	United States	Hobby Center for the Performing Arts
9 June 2016	San Antonio	United States	Tobin Center for the Performing Arts
10 June 2016	Austin	United States	Bass Concert Hall
12 June 2016	Las Vegas	United States	Smith Center for the Performing Arts
14 June 2016	Oakland	United States	Paramount Theatre
15 June 2016	Sacramento	United States	Community Center Theater
16 June 2016	Cupertino	United States	Flint Center
18 June 2016	Seattle	United States	Paramount Theatre
21 June 2016	Phoenix	United States	Comerica Theater
22 June 2016	Costa Mesa	United States	Segerstrom Center for the Arts
23 June 2016 Matinee	Hollywood	United States	Dolby Theatre
23 June 2016 Evening	Hollywood	United States	Dolby Theatre
Australia
12 August 2016	Perth	Australia	Riverside Theatre
14 August 2016	Perth	Australia	Riverside Theatre
19 August 2016 Matinee	Adelaide	Australia	Thebarton Theatre
19 August 2016 Evening	Adelaide	Australia	Thebarton Theatre
21 August 2016 Matinee	Melbourne	Australia	Palais Theatre
21 August 2016 Evening	Melbourne	Australia	Palais Theatre
22 August 2016	Sydney	Australia	Big Top Sydney
23 August 2016	Sydney	Australia	Big Top Sydney
24 August 2016	Brisbane	Australia	Queensland Performing Arts Centre
25 August 2016	Brisbane	Australia	Queensland Performing Arts Centre
Europe
21 November 2016	Dublin	Ireland	Olympia Theatre
27 November 2016 Matinee	Berlin	Germany	Admiralspalast
27 November 2016 Evening	Berlin	Germany	Admiralspalast
5 December 2016	Stockholm	Sweden	Cirkus
6 December 2016	Stockholm	Sweden	Cirkus
