= Dan and Phil (radio show) =

2013–2014 British radio show on BBC Radio 1

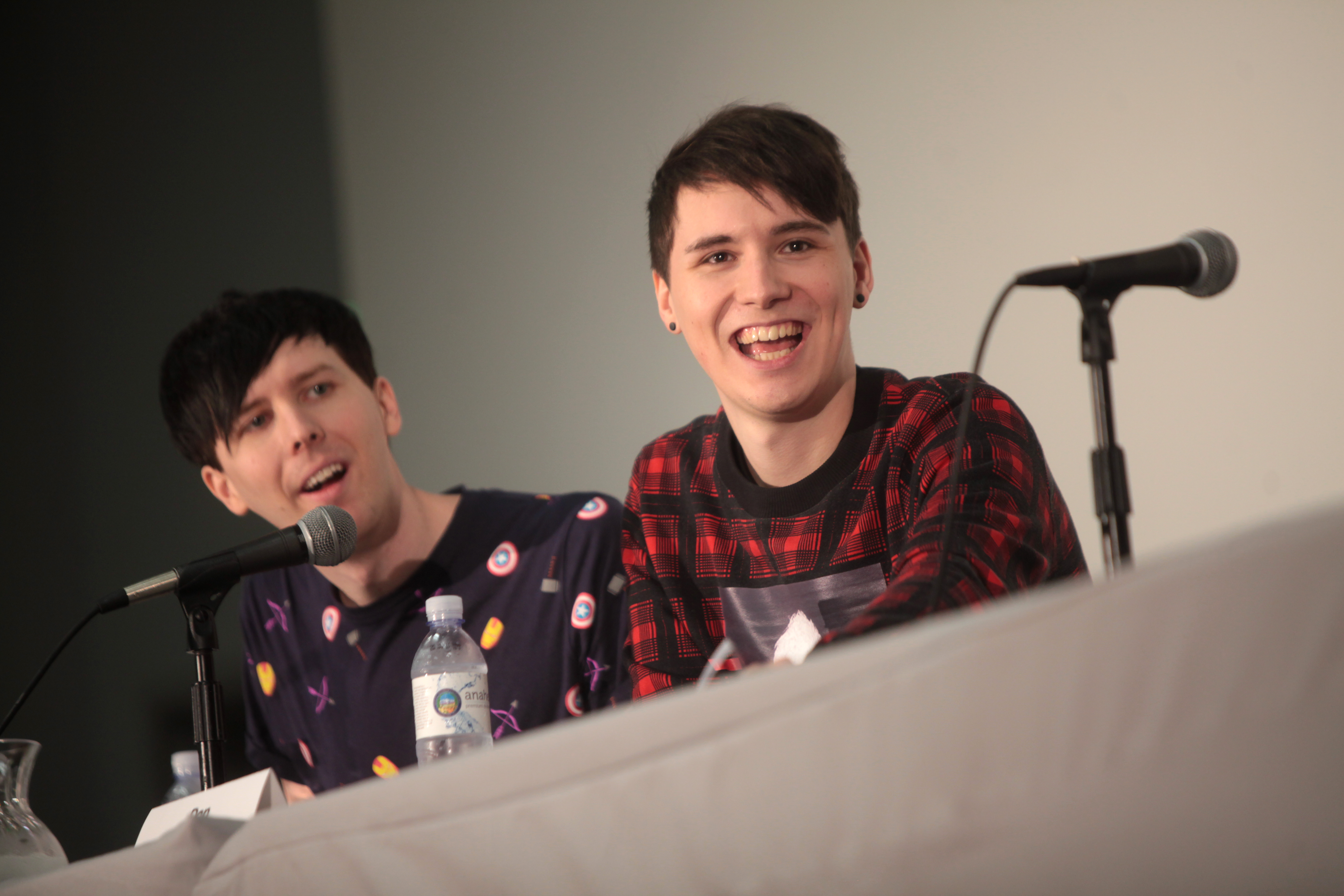
- Dan Howell (right) and Phil Lester, presenters of the show, at VidCon 2014
- Other names: The Dan and Phil Show; The Radio 1 Request Show with Dan and Phil
- Genre: Music, chat
- Running time: 120 minutes (7:00 pm – 9:00 pm)
- Country of origin: United Kingdom and Worldwide
- Language: English
- Home station: BBC Radio 1
- Hosted by: Dan and Phil
- Produced by: Alistair Parrington, Victoria Easton
- Recording studio: 82A, Broadcasting House, London
- Original release: 13 January 2013 – 24 August 2014
- No. of series: 4
- No. of episodes: 80
- Audio format: Stereophonic sound
- Website: www.bbc.co.uk/programmes/b01971l5

Dan and Phil (previously known as The Radio 1 Request Show) is a British radio show that aired on BBC Radio 1 from 2013 to 2014. It was presented by Dan and Phil, an entertainment duo consisting of Daniel Howell and Phil Lester.

The show was a spiritual successor to the original Request Show on the station, allowing listeners to request songs to be played but also encompassing additional entertainment features. It was loosely based on Dan and Phil's now discontinued internet series, The Super Amazing Project, which included segments such as Internet News.

The show's successor, The Internet Takeover, began airing on 1 September 2014 at 9pm.

== History ==
The Radio 1 Request Show was originally hosted by Reggie Yates on Saturday afternoons (October 2007 until April 2012), and Jameela Jamil on Sunday evenings (April 2012 until January 2013).

After doing a variety of other work for BBC Radio 1, such as one-off shows at Christmas and work at the station's presence at the Edinburgh Festival Fringe, in November 2012 it was announced that Dan and Phil would present the show, with the visual element bringing a change of format. Part of the reasoning behind this was to add to the station-wide effort of lowering the average listener age.

In June 2014, it was announced that starting 1 September 2014, the presenters would move to a weekly Monday night slot, from 9pm to 10pm, to a show that would continue to be fully visualised. The show, The Internet Takeover, incorporated some features from the original Dan and Phil show, such as the Internet News and the audience's music videos (though listeners would be unable to request songs to be played).

The final Dan and Phil show was broadcast on 24 August 2014, effectively leaving the station without a request show.

== Format ==
The entire show was visualised, and could be watched live on the BBC Radio 1 website. Viewers could see in real time what is happening in the studio, the presenters' challenges, interviews with musicians or people involved in internet culture, and music videos created by the audience.

During the show, listeners were encouraged to call, text, tweet and post on the station's Facebook page. Listeners could have their comments read out and call in to talk live on the show.

=== Fan Wars (2013) ===
Dan and Phil used to have a section entitled Fan Wars in which two listeners would call in to represent two musical artists in a competition, which varied every week. The winner of the competition would get their respective artist's song played. Fan Wars was replaced with a new segment; Sorry, I Don't Know How to Internet, for 2014.

=== Internet News (2013–2014) ===
In Internet News, Dan and Phil read out bizarre and off-beat news stories, discovered from around the internet. The segment was a parody of regular news programming, with an orchestral soundtrack and the presenters wearing glasses with no lenses which they called their "news glasses".

=== Dan vs. Phil (2013–2014) ===
A physical challenge is chosen by BBC staff for the presenters to take part in on video, while music from the Radio 1 playlist can be heard in the background. The winner is chosen from the number of points each presenter receives; a different caller announced the winner of the segment each week. In early episodes, the segment had been more interactive, with listeners of the show being able to choose a challenge on the Facebook page and Twitter of Radio 1, and the audience being able to vote on the winner of each week.

=== Rehab Topic (2013–2014) ===
Each show had a themed hashtag that listeners could use on Twitter to share their experiences on the topic. For example, #FoodFails, where people gave their negative experiences on cooking. If someone's experience is particularly interesting or humorous, the producers of the show would allow that listener to call in and explain it to Dan and Phil.

=== Music Videos (2013–2014) ===
During the show, numerous music videos were shown which were created by the audience to a song of their choice. Listeners could submit these in advance of the show via email. These videos acted as a different way to request a song; the accompanying music was often not on the Radio 1 playlist.

=== Sorry, I Don't Know How to Internet (2014) ===
Sorry, I Don't Know How to Internet was introduced at the start of 2014 as a replacement for Fan Wars. The segment consisted of Dan and Phil reading out humorous stories of elder relatives and people new to IT being unable to use modern technology. Often, stories were read out by other presenters on the station, such as Greg James.

The stories were sent in by listeners and other BBC Radio 1 DJs.

== The Internet Takeover ==
Following the final Dan and Phil broadcast in August 2014, Dan and Phil moved to presenting a new Radio 1 show, The Internet Takeover, in September 2014. The show was presented by various members of the online video blogging (vlogging) community. The Internet Takeover featured a rotation of vloggers, with Dan and Phil presenting once a month. The show came to an end in April 2016, when it was replaced by The Student Radio Playlist.

=== Presenters ===
Aside from Dan and Phil, the various presenters of The Internet Takeover included:

- Zoe Sugg (Zoella)
- Tyler Oakley
- Tom Ridgewell
- Troye Sivan
- Joe Sugg
- Louise Pentland (Sprinkle of Glitter)
- Marcus Butler
- Caspar Lee
- Charlotte McDonnell
- Alfie Deyes (PointlessBlog)
- Jim Chapman
- Dan Middleton (The Diamond Minecart)
- Rose and Rosie
- Benjamin Cook
- Emma Blackery and Luke Cutforth
- PewDiePie (Felix Kjellberg)
- Hazel Hayes
- Carrie Hope Fletcher

=== Special editions ===
In February 2015, Daniel Howell hosted a "#NicerInternet" special of the radio show, titled Anti-Social Media Live. He was joined by other Internet Takeover presenters including Phil Lester, Jack Howard, Dean Dobbs, Jim Chapman, Patricia Bright, Tom Ridgewell, Louise Pentland and Charlotte McDonnell. The panel discussed online bullying, shared stories of their own negative experiences and explored ways in which the internet could be made a nicer place.

== Reception ==
Pocket-lint called the addition of the show to BBC Radio 1's schedule a "bold move" while The Telegraph described the show as "reminiscent of that film Bill and Ted’s Excellent Adventure with Keanu Reeves and Alex Winter". The Guardian made reference to the show's young demographic, stating that while the viewer-made music videos were "sweet", it was "too tame to be funny to adults".

=== Awards and nominations ===
Year	Award	Nominee	Result
2013	Sony Golden Headphones Award	Dan and Phil	Won
