= Angela Davis (chef) =

US chef and food blogger

- Born: 1981 (age 44–45)
- Other name: The Kitchenista
- Occupations: Chef, food blogger
- Years active: 2012–present
- Known for: The Kitchenista Diaries (blog)
- Website: kitchenistadiaries.com

Angela Davis, also known as The Kitchenista, is an American chef, food blogger, recipe developer, and cookbook author. She created her blog The Kitchenista Diaries in 2012, and her work has appeared in outlets including Huffington Post, Hour Detroit, Food 52, and the Washington Post.

== Career ==
A self-taught chef, Davis began learning to cook in her twenties. She started the food blog The Kitchenista Diaries in 2012 while working as an accountant. In 2013, she was laid off, and decided to focus on her blog full-time. She also began working as a private chef, catering, and hosting live cooking events. Her first major catering event was a concert for The Roots. In 2019 she also began developing recipes for restaurants.

Davis uses social media sites, particularly Twitter, to help build her audience, and has credited such platforms with providing her referrals for offline opportunities. She uses the Twitter hashtag #KitchenistaSundays to encourage followers to share their homecooked meals, and began a Washington, D.C. family-style dinner event series with the same name. Lauren Masur wrote in The Kitchn in 2019 that Davis was "one of the funniest food personalities on Twitter".

Davis has worked with companies such as Aveeno, Royal Caribbean, and KitchenAid. She has published multiple digital cookbooks, which accounted for over 50 percent of her income as of 2019.

In 2012, Davis won "Best Food Blog" in the Black Weblog Awards. In 2013, Davis was one of two winners in the Food category of the 5th Shorty Awards.

== Influences ==
Davis's earliest models for cooking were her parents and her grandmothers, one who cooked soul food and the other who cooked Cape Verdean cuisine. She has spoken about the importance of preserving Black heritage through cooking traditional dishes. Two of her signatures dishes, her biscuits and her macaroni and cheese, are rooted in her upbringing in the South.

She has noted the underrepresentation of Black food bloggers, and has advocated for educational institutions to create more pathways to culinary careers. She names Carla Hall and G. Garvin as two of her chef inspirations.

== Personal life ==
Davis moved around frequently during her childhood because her father was in the military. She lived in Florida and Virginia in her adulthood. She is of African American and Cape Verdean descent. Davis has a son and a daughter. As of 2019, she resided in Detroit.
