= You Will Get Through This Night =

2021 non-fiction book by Daniel Howell

- Original UK cover
- Author: Daniel Howell
- Audio read by: Daniel Howell
- Language: English
- Genre: Non-fiction, self-help, humour
- Publisher: HarperCollins
- Publication date: 18 May 2021
- Publication place: United Kingdom
- Media type: Print (hardcover, paperback), e-book, audio
- Pages: 320
- ISBN: 978-0-063-05388-5

You Will Get Through This Night is a 2021 non-fiction book written by British YouTuber and author Daniel Howell, in consultation with psychologist Dr Heather Bolton. It is described as "a practical guide to taking control of your mental health for today, tomorrow, and the days after". The book was published on 18 May 2021 by HarperCollins under the HQ and Dey Street Books imprints. A paperback edition was published in 2024.

== Contents ==
The main purpose of You Will Get Through This Night, is to act as a practical mental health guide written from "the perspective of someone who has been through it all—this no-nonsense book gives you the tools to understand your mind so you can be in control and really live."

The book is split into three sections:

- This Night: Learn how to manage your thoughts and feelings in tough times
- Tomorrow: Change your everyday habits to be healthier and happier
- The Days After That: Understand your behavior and how to treat yourself with compassion to tackle life's challenges.

== Reception ==
In March 2021, Emily Bowels, in Library Journal, wrote "Howell [...] has written a book that could be read in tandem with The Midnight Library by Matt Haig", concluding "Bold, raw, and powerful, Howell's book—which also draws from his own experiences—becomes one thread of a narrative about finding hope and healing. It doesn't ever feel too positive, simplistic, reductive, or one-dimensional. Like his previous books, this one will find a wide audience."

Glamour UK posted an extract about dealing with setbacks, calling it "essential reading" during an increase in depression and other mental health issues among adults.

You Will Get Through This Night became a #1 Sunday Times Bestseller. The book appeared on a list of the Best Books of 2021 by Barnes & Noble.
