= Gaylor conspiracy theory =

Conspiracy theory about Taylor Swift

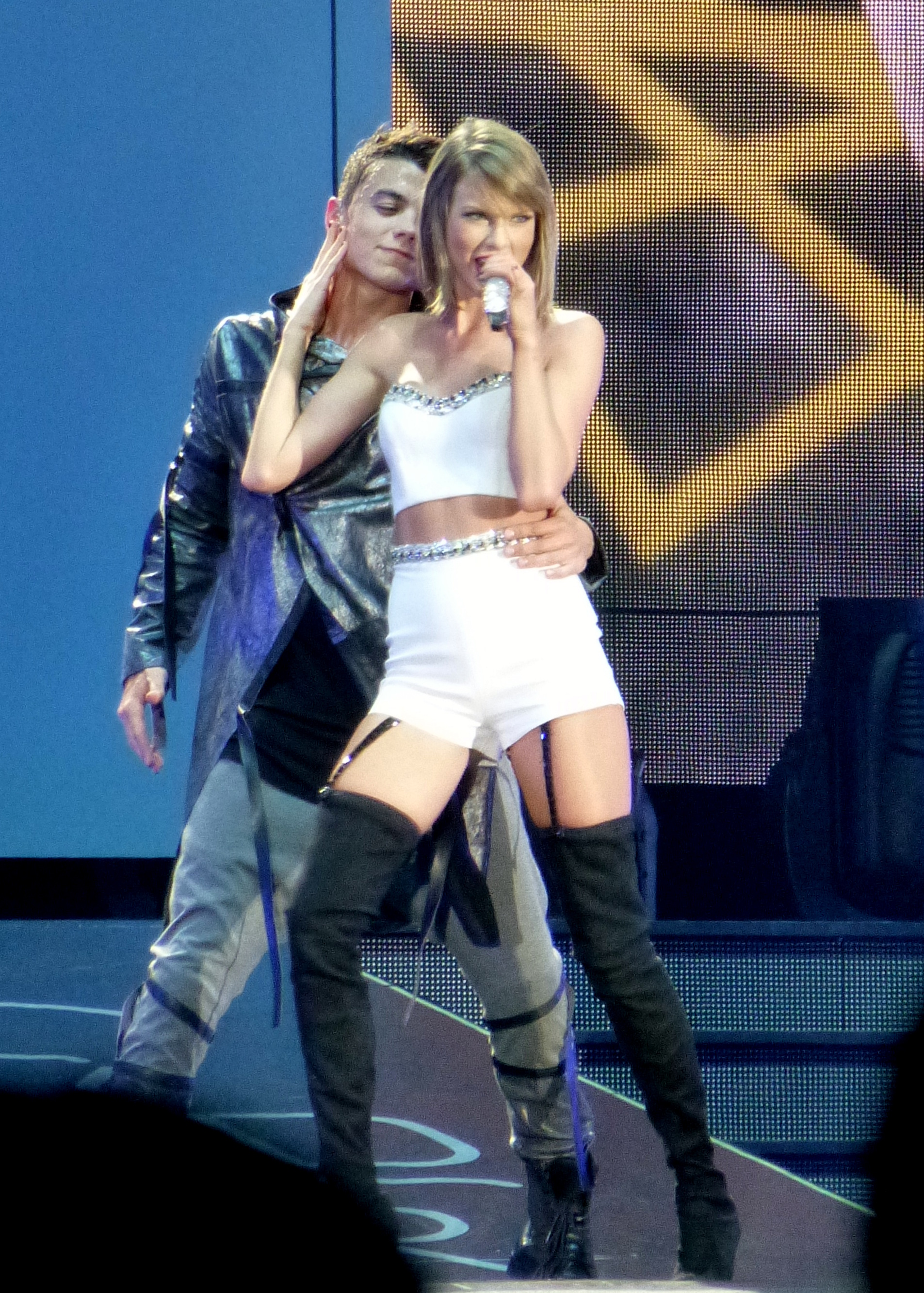
Taylor Swift on the 1989 World Tour (2015). Gaylor purports that Swift is a closeted queer woman conformed to the heteronormative expectations of the general public and mainstream media.

Gaylor, sometimes referred to as Gaylorism, is a conspiracy theory that claims that the American musician Taylor Swift is either lesbian or bisexual. The small faction of her fans (Swifties) who subscribe to this belief are called Gaylors. They assert that Swift has signaled queerness throughout her artistic output.

Gaylors perceive Swift as a closeted sapphic woman forced to conform to a heteronormative society. A number of them disregard her heterosexual relationships as publicity stunts. The theory originated in blogs of the early 2010s, and initially revolved around a rumored romantic relationship between Swift and the American actress Dianna Agron. It gained considerable traction and tabloid coverage when some fans began shipping Swift with the American model Karlie Kloss in 2014. Both Agron and Kloss have dismissed the alleged relationships as rumors. (Note: When questioned about the veracity of Gaylor, both Agron and Kloss refused to confirm the rumors and highlighted that tabloid media stories about them are not always true. Both women have consistently identified publicly as heterosexual throughout their careers, and have only ever publicly dated men. Additionally, Kloss has been married to the American investor Joshua Kushner since 2018, and has had three children with him.)

Swift has positioned herself as an ally of the LGBTQ community. Critics and authors have recognized queer interpretations of Swift's lyrics but have largely rejected Gaylor as an invasive conspiracy theory resulting from some fans' parasocial interaction with her. According to CNN, Swift's associates have called Gaylor "invasive, untrue and inappropriate", in response to articles about the topic. A majority of Swifties criticize Gaylor as a far-fetched rumor disrespectful to Swift. In 2023, Swift wrote in the 1989 (Taylor's Version) album prologue that the tabloid media have sexualized her friendship with women in the same way they had with her male friends. In 2025, she became engaged to the American football player Travis Kelce, which drew disapproval from some Gaylors; Swift and Kelce married in 2026.

== Background ==
Taylor Swift is an American singer-songwriter, with a career of enduring success since 2006. Lyrically, a significant portion of her discography is about love and related topics. Her private life is highly publicized by the press, reporters, and media outlets, both printed and online, and her dating life is a subject of constant tabloid scrutiny. According to the journalist Jody Rosen, the media enjoys guessing the celebrity inspiration behind Swift's songs. Some media outlets and journalists are also noted for their frequent reporting on Swift for clickbait and readership gains, capitalizing on consumer interest in "juicy" gossip about Swift's life.

Rumors about Swift's sexuality and romantic inclinations have existed since the early days of her career. She has been rumored to have been romantically linked with famous acquaintances she has never officially dated, such as Cory Monteith, Adam Young, Chord Overstreet, Eddie Redmayne, Zac Efron, and Alexander Skarsgård. Swift has also been the subject of multiple conspiracy theories, with a falsified public image being the common theme.

=== Definition ===
Gaylor is a closeting conspiracy theory about Swift. The neologism "Gaylor" is a portmanteau of "gay" and "Taylor". Fans or listeners of Swift who believe Gaylor are referred to as Gaylors. They have been described as sub-fandom and an online subculture of the Swifties. Gaylors believe Swift is sexually or romantically attracted to women, and therefore she is a closeted lesbian, or sapphic. Gaylors, who are mostly queer women, refer to non-Gaylor Swifties— those who believe Swift's sexuality is not on the LGBTQ spectrum, and that Swift is heterosexual unless she announces otherwise— as "Hetlors".

=== Beliefs ===
According to Gaylors, Swift's music and other works include coded signals about her queer sexuality. They consider her romantic relationships with men to be public relation (PR) stunts fabricated to distract the public from her secretive relationships with women, specifically with the American model Karlie Kloss. The LGBTQ publication Them stated that Gaylor comprises queer analyses of her lyricism and a queer understanding of her female relationships, especially those with Kloss and the American actress Dianna Agron. As per reporter Jon Niccum, Gaylors "embrace subversive readings of Swift's songs and seek to compile evidence she is secretly queer."

Swift, despite being one of the biggest musicians in history, closely follows her fans on social media. The idea that Swift has not publicly rebuked Gaylor despite coming across the theories has been cited as one reason for the persistence of Gaylor. A key component of Gaylor theory is the belief that Swift uses easter eggs as a form of queer coding, to communicate messages about her sexuality or secret relationships to her LGBTQ and ally fans without outing herself. Easter eggs have been integral part of Swift's career and her legacy. Swift has said she "trained" her fans to look for hidden meaning in everything she does. Her use of easter eggs extends far beyond her body of work.

Gaylors have purported Swift's intentional use of easter eggs, as well as reputation for being in tune with her fanbase, as evidence that the queer subtext they see has been deliberately planted for them to find. Swift began using easter eggs in the CD booklet for her debut album (2006). She stylized the lyrics in all lowercase and used uppercase for seemingly random letters to spell out secret messages to her fans, which is a form of easter egg she continued to use with some of her other albums.

=== Community ===
Gaylors are mostly an online community. In 2023, Rolling Stone reported that social media tracking firm Graphika estimated that Gaylors made up 9% of Swift's online fandom at that time, whereas another 26% of fans were impartial to the theory. The subreddit titled "Gaylor Swift", where popular discussions supporting Gaylor have taken place, had more than 50,000 members as of 2025. Gaylors have hosted events and gatherings such as "Camp Gaylore" to discuss Swift and her discography in a queer lens.

== Timeline ==
=== 2012–2015: Origins ===
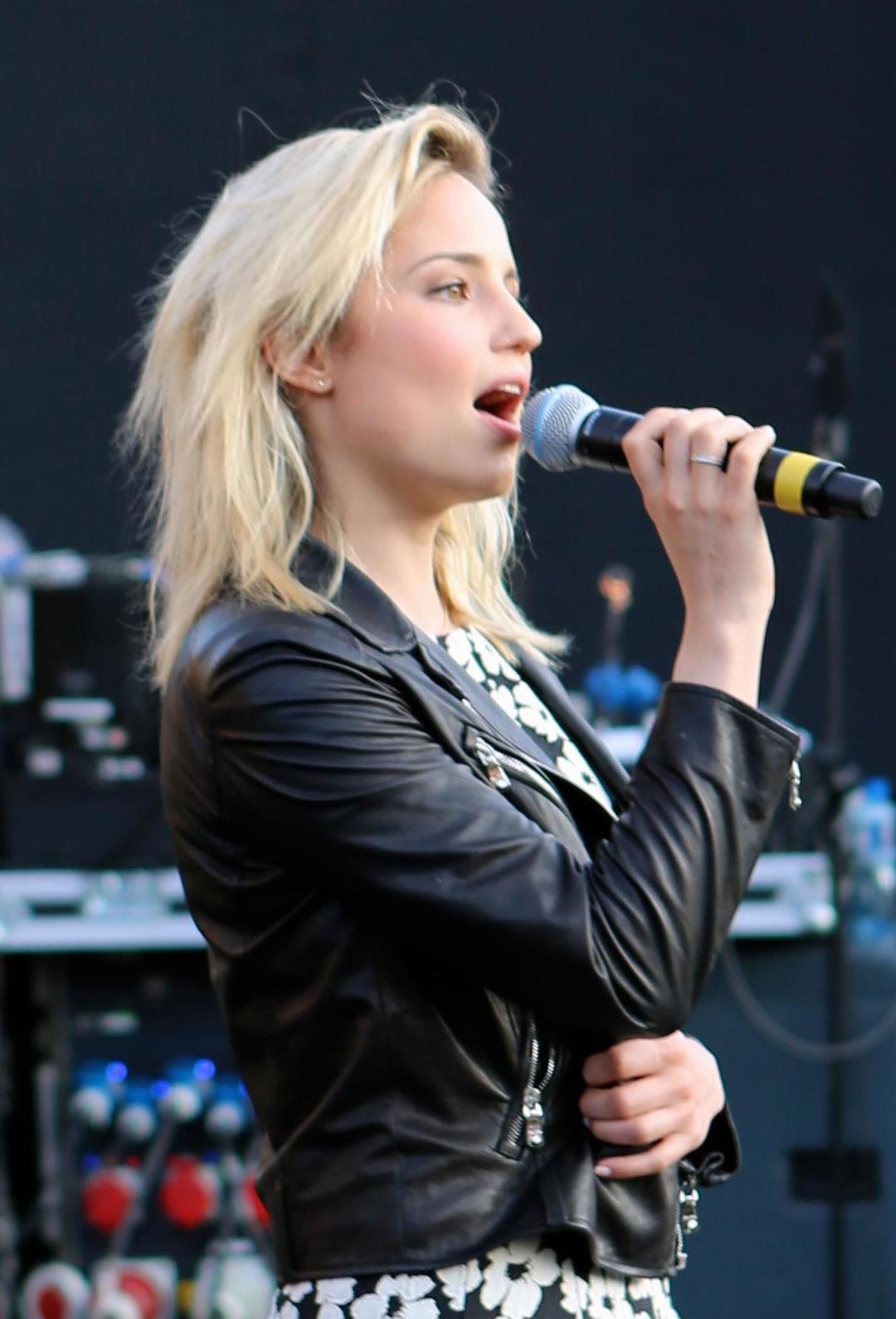
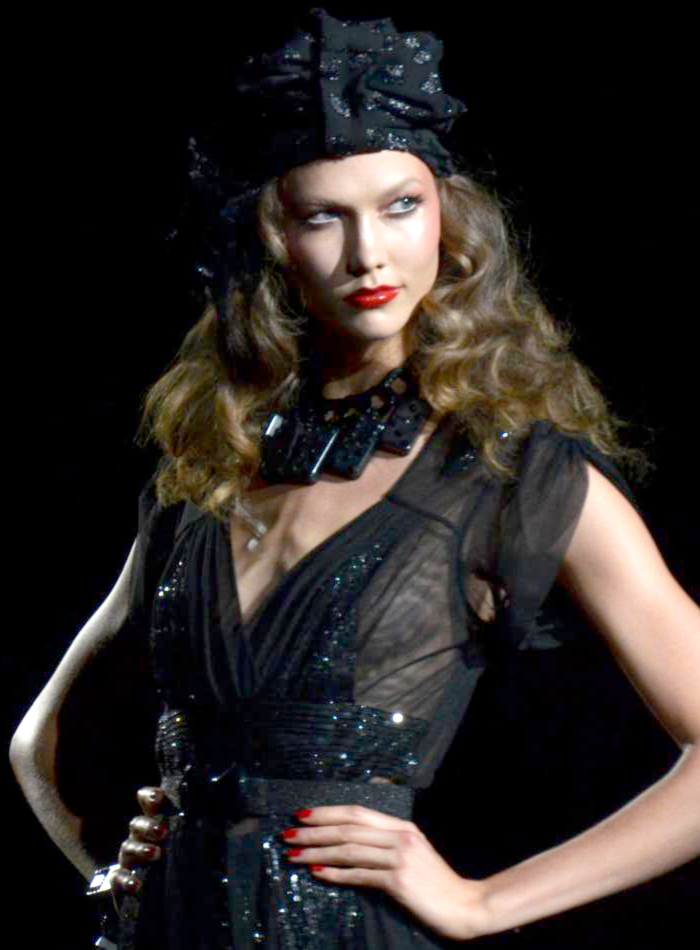
Dianna Agron (left) and Karlie Kloss (right) are two celebrities that are often associated with Swift in Gaylor theories.

Beliefs associated with Gaylor originated on blogs in the early 2010s, around the time when some tabloids reported that Swift was romantically involved with Agron, who was known for her breakout role as Quinn Fabray in the comedy drama musical Glee (2009–2015). Some fans speculated about a relationship between the two after Swift named Agron in the liner notes of her album Red (2012). Fan theories arose about themes in Swift's music and in social media posts by both women and their associates, that allegedly pointed to a romantic relationship. Agron's decision to remove a tattoo allegedly referenced in one of Swift's songs was also perceived by Gaylors as an attempt to hide their alleged relationship.

Around the same time, there was also a rumor that Swift and Agron were involved in a love triangle with National Football League (NFL) player Tim Tebow. In 2013, Agron denied the rumor on Jimmy Kimmel Live! and Tebow denied it on Good Morning America.

Kloss befriended Swift in 2012 or 2013, and has been shipped with Swift since. Kloss had been dating the American businessman Joshua Kushner since 2012; they married in 2018 and have three children. One of the first significant controversies in Gaylor theory occurred in December 2014, when pictures and video taken by a fan at a The 1975 concert attended by Swift and Kloss were made public. The fan claimed that the picture and video showed Swift and Kloss kissing, an event that some referred to as "Kissgate". Swift and her publicist both responded, shutting down the rumor. Swift's representative described the allegations a "crap".

=== 2016–2019: Gaining traction ===
Some Gaylors believed Swift and Kloss had a glass closet relationship, and that the media would straightwash them as they have done with celebrities like Kristen Stewart and Demi Lovato. In 2016, Swift moved to Cornelia Street in Greenwich Village, half a mile from Kloss's home, which some Gaylors believe indicated a romantic relationship.

During the promotional rollout of Reputation (2017), Swift drastically expanded and increased her use of easter eggs, starting with the lead single "Look What You Made Me Do" and its music video. This increase in easter eggs was born out of her desire to continue to communicate with her fans during a time when she was not giving interviews. In August 2017, Swift released her comeback single "Look What You Made Me Do" video. In one of its many reference-laden scenes, Swift dawned a "You Belong With Me"-inspired t-shirt with names of her best friends such as Selena Gomez, Martha Hunt, and Gigi Hadid, while Kloss' name was absent, generating press and surprised reactions from Swifties. Reputation was a pivotal moment in Swift's career, and for the Swifties, who grew more tightly knit as a result of Swift's disappearance from the public eye. The same was said for Gaylor, as several ongoing themes in Swift's work that are often cited as Gaylor evidence arose during the Reputation rollout. In February 2018, during an interview for spy thriller film Red Sparrow, American actress Jennifer Lawrence jokingly said she wanted to know "what's going on with Karlie Kloss and Taylor Swift," adding that it was keeping her up at night, after Kloss and Swift were not seen together in months.

Gaylors believed Swift swapped a lyric in her song "New Year's Day" from "I want your midnights" to "I want her midnights" during a performance at the Time 100 gala on April 23, 2019, which followed an uptick in rainbow imagery on her social media. During this time Swift was also teasing a big announcement for April 26, 2019, Lesbian Visibility Day, and there was speculation she was planning to come out. The announcement ended up being the release of her single "Me!" off her her next album, Lover.

While promoting Lover, Swift released the single "You Need to Calm Down" in support of the LGBTQ community on June 14, 2019, during Pride Month. The same night she appeared as a surprise guest at the 50th anniversary celebration of the Stonewall riots at the Stonewall Inn, where she performed "Shake It Off" with Jesse Tyler Ferguson of Modern Family. Swift released the music video for "You Need to Calm Down" on June 17, which shows her wearing what some identified as the bisexual pride colors in her hair. In the video she features almost 30 queer and trans celebrities, as well as several references to queer culture. The video ends with a link to a change.org petition in support of the Equality Act. While some believed Swift's increased support for the LGBTQ community was indicative of a queer identity, while others dubbed it simply an example of allyship.

=== 2020–present: Persistence ===
Publications reported a fallout between Swift and Kloss from around 2019. They were last photographed together in August 2018, backstage at the Reputation Stadium Tour's stop in Nashville. Two months later, Swift was absent from the wedding and related events of Kloss and Kushner, fueling media stories about a rift due to Kloss' association with Kim Kardashian, Scooter Braun, and Katy Perry, all of whom had disputes with Swift at the time. Some considered Swift's 2020 albums Folklore and Evermore as "queer albums". Nuanced albeit biased interpretations of songs such as "You Need to Calm Down", "The Very First Night" (2021), "Lavender Haze" (2022), and "Betty" (2020) were cited by Gaylors as evidence for their theory.

In 2023, Swift began dating American football player Travis Kelce. During an interview with Rolling Stone the same year, Agron was asked how she felt about being the inspiration for one of Swift's songs and about the theory that she and Swift had dated. Agron has described the rumors as "funny", adding that many "wildly untrue" claims have been reported about her dating life. The same year, Kloss was spotted "singing and dancing" at a Los Angeles concert on Swift's Eras Tour eventhough they were not seen together. According to Entertainment Weekly, Swift and Kloss "mended the rift" privately.

Three years later, on July 3, 2026, Kloss and Kushner arrived at the Madison Square Garden for Swift and Kelce's wedding, understood as the confirmation of their mended friendship by Swifties, who were "shocked" across social media platforms. Weeks later, Kloss was enquired about Swift's wedding on the Today show, where she responded "Listen, I try to protect the privacy of my friends' personal lives [...] what I will say is that they're are an amazing couple and I'm so happy for them." On November 8, Kloss joined Swift in her private suite at the Arrowhead Stadium for Kelce and the Kansas City Chiefs' game against the New York Jets, alongside Swift's mother Andrea and mother-in-law Donna Kelce. It marked Swift and Kloss' first public appearance together after eight years.

== Responses ==
=== Criticism and rebuttal ===
It became clear to me that for me, there was no such thing as casual dating, or even having a male friend who you platonically hang out with. If I was seen with him, it was assumed I was sleeping with him, and so I swore off hanging out with guys. Dating, flirting, or anything that could be weaponized against me by a culture that claimed to believe in liberating women but consistently treated me with the harsh moral codes of the Victorian era. Being a consummate optimist, I assumed I could fix this if I simply changed my behavior. I swore off dating and decided to focus only on myself, my music, my growth, and my female friendships. If I only hung out with my female friends, people couldn't sensationalize or sexualize that, right? I would learn later on that people could and people would.

— Swift, in the prologue of 1989 (Taylor's Version) (2023)

Swift has positioned herself as an ally of the LGBTQ community. In a 2019 Vogue interview following her "You Need to Calm Down" music video, she said "rights are being stripped from basically everyone who isn't a straight white cisgender male, I didn't realize until recently that I could advocate for a community that I'm not a part of."

Some Swifties believe Gaylor is malicious and disrespectful to Swift. Journalists likewise dismiss it as an invasive and baseless conspiracy theory, a consequence of some fans' parasocial interest in the singer. In the album prologue to 1989 (Taylor's Version), Swift stated that her female friendships have been sexualized in tabloid media coverage in the same way her male acquaintances have been.

A January 2024 opinion article by writer Anna Marks, published in The New York Times, speculated that Swift is a closeted queer person based on Marks' perceptions of Swift's lyrics and aesthetics, drawing criticism from Swifties and other readers. Subsequently, CNN Business reported that Swift's personnel found the article "invasive, untrue and inappropriate". American country singer and queer activist Chely Wright commented that "seeing a public person's sexuality being discussed is upsetting."

In August 2025, when Swift announced her engagement to Kelce, Gaylors "mourned" the news and "melt down" according to reporters, and the Gaylor subreddit went private to avoid trolling from outsiders. Rolling Stone reported that, before going private, some subreddit members claimed Kelce is a beard and that Swift's engagement dress looked like a prison uniform, while others questioned if their beliefs were always false. Some members claimed to have suffered severe mental distress over the news, including panic attacks. Some declared the relationship is "staged for public consumption", while others acknowledged Swift as a bisexual woman. The LGBTQ magazine Out stated that Gaylors "will find any way to push their agenda" even after the engagement.

=== Scholarly assessment ===
Taylor has this image of being very heterosexual. Earlier in her career, she was criticized for singing and writing too much about her boyfriends and for being overly invested in patriarchal, heteronormative romance. For fans to find queer themes in her songs — or to think she is herself queer — is quite remarkable.

— Brian Donovan, professor of sociology at University of Kansas

Various authors and academics have described Gaylor as a conspiracy theory. American sociologist Brian Donovan of the University of Kansas has extensively studied fandoms, Swift, and the various subsets of Swifties. He published a paper dedicated to Gaylors in December 2024, affirming the queer interpretation of her music but disapproving of harmful parasocial interactions and queer reimagination of Swift's life.

Frankie de la Cretaz of Xtra Magazine stated that it is homophobic to expect a queer lens not be applied to Swift's songs and writing. Gay Times author Zoya Raza Sheikh argued, "while there's nothing wrong with viewing Swift's work through a queer lens, there's an issue when these readings are mainstreamed — and therefore legitimized", and suggested that listeners looking for queer visibility should explore acts like Reneé Rapp or Omar Apollo instead of Swift.

Pride.com's Rachel Kiley opined that coming-out is not always a big announcement, and that both queer readings of art and queer-flagging have long been a part of queer culture. English columnist Sarah Ditum wrote in The Critic that, while a popular musician being closeted made sense in the 20th century — as was the case of the English singer-songwriter George Michael, it does not apply to the 21st-century as queerness is no longer a "career impediment" for pop artists. Ditum named Rapp, Chappell Roan, and Billie Eilish as examples of successful and openly queer female popstars.
