= The Amazing Book Is Not on Fire =

2015 book by Daniel Howell and Phil Lester

The Amazing Book Is Not on Fire: The World of Dan and Phil
- Author: Daniel Howell; Phil Lester
- Audio read by: Daniel Howell; Phil Lester
- Language: English
- Genre: Autobiography; humour
- Publisher: Ebury Publishing
- Publication date: 8 October 2015
- Awards: Book of the Year at 2016 Summer in the City Awards
- ISBN: 978-1-78503-109-0 (hardcover)
- Followed by: Dan and Phil Go Outside

The Amazing Book Is Not on Fire is a humorous autobiographical book by Daniel Howell and Phil Lester, released on 8 October 2015 by Ebury Publishing. The book was published on the same date as their first show on the theatrical tour The Amazing Tour Is Not on Fire. It is their first shared published book, to be followed by Dan and Phil Go Outside.

== Content ==
The Amazing Book Is Not on Fire includes behind-the-scenes stories told through the forms of interviews, lists, images, old diaries and websites, trivia, activities such as quizzes, and fan art. Some sections are written adaptations of existing YouTube videos, including the first entry in Lester's Why I was a weird kid series. Other segments later inspired videos, such as the What Dan and Phil Text Each Other series that originally appeared in the book.

== Reception ==
The Amazing Book Is Not on Fire took the number-two spot on The Official UK Top 50 and took the number-one spot of Hardback Non-Fiction list. It sold 26,744 copies in a week. Common Sense Media rated the book at four stars, calling it "a lively, engaging, and surprisingly thoughtful and thorough look at what it takes to make successful YouTube videos."
