= Phil Lester =

English YouTuber and presenter (born 1987)

- Lester in 2026
- Born: Philip Michael Lester; 30 January 1987 (age 39); Rawtenstall, Lancashire, England
- Education: University of York (BA, MA)
- Occupations: YouTuber; radio presenter
- Partner: Daniel Howell (2009–present)

YouTube information
- Channel: AmazingPhil
- Years active: 2006–present
- Subscribers: 3.85 million
- Views: 699.37 million
- Last updated: 12 November 2026

Philip Michael Lester (born 30 January 1987) is an English YouTuber and presenter. He is best known for his YouTube channels AmazingPhil and Dan and Phil (formerly DanAndPhilGAMES), which, as of March 2026, have 3.85 million and 3.1 million subscribers, respectively. Active since 2006, Lester is considered among the first notable British YouTubers. Lester appeared on a Sunday Times 2019 list of the top influencers in the United Kingdom.

Lester is also known for his frequent collaboration with his partner, Daniel Howell, as part of the entertainment duo Dan and Phil. Together, they presented the Sunday night entertainment show Dan and Phil on BBC Radio 1 from January 2013 until August 2014, and from September 2014 to April 2016 the duo were monthly hosts on the station's The Internet Takeover slot.

== Early life ==
Phillip Michael Lester was born on 30 January 1987 and grew up in Rawtenstall, Lancashire. He has an older brother, Martyn. Lester attended Helmshore Primary School and then Bacup and Rawtenstall Grammar School.

Before making vlogging and radio presenting his full-time profession, Lester's early jobs included dog walking, washing cars, veterinary clinic assistant, working at WHSmith, and appearing in Faintheart. Lester graduated with a Bachelor of Arts with Honours in English Language and Linguistics in 2008 and a Master of Arts in Video Postproduction with Visual Effects in 2009, both from the University of York.

== Career ==
=== YouTube ===
At age 19 on 27 March 2006, Lester posted his first YouTube vlog titled "Phil's Video Blog" on his main YouTube channel AmazingPhil filmed on a black and white camera he won out of a cereal box. One of the first notable British YouTubers, Lester grew an audience through storytelling, vlogs, challenges as well as comedy, horror and surrealist sketches. He has posted over 350 videos on his channel and, as of November 2025, has over 3.85 million subscribers and 694 million video views. He reached 1 million YouTube subscribers on 6 July 2013, 2 million on 29 August 2014, 3 million on 12 October 2015, and 4 million on 14 March 2017.

Lester also has a second channel LessAmazingPhil, which has over 1 million subscribers and 28 million views, as of November 2025. He occasionally broadcast hour-long live shows on this channel, as well as YouNow livestreams. In late 2020 and early 2021, Lester broadcast on Stereo.

From 2009 to 2011, Lester had a recurring role in RTÉ's Ireland-based cross-media show Apartment Red (also stylised as ApartmentRED), hosted by Stephen Byrne.

In 2010, Lester and Howell took part in the live, annual 24-hour internet broadcast "Stickaid", a fundraiser for charity UNICEF.

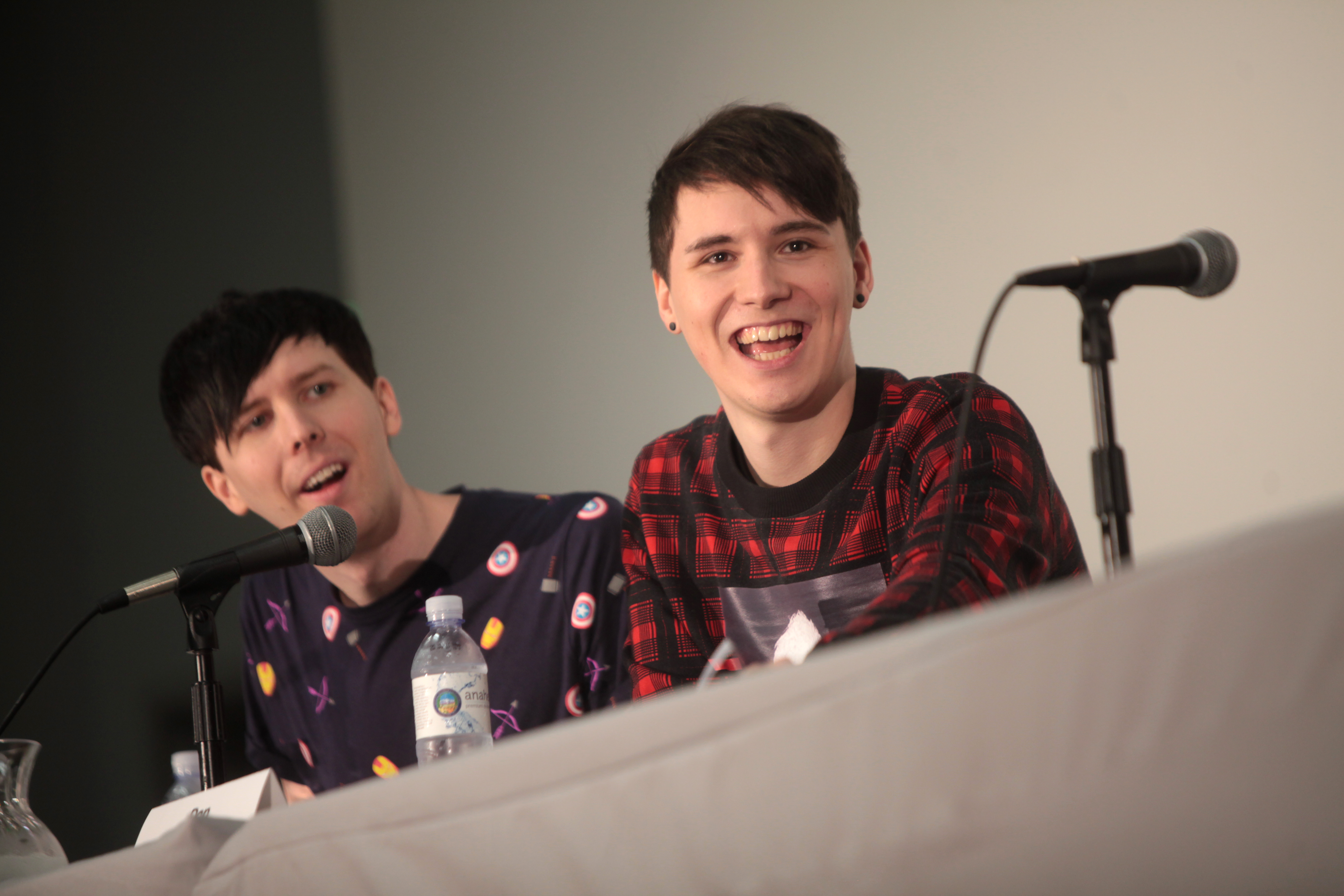
Lester and Howell at VidCon 2014

In October 2011, Lester and Howell created a collaborative YouTube channel via the network My Damn Channel titled The Super Amazing Project, which the pair hosted through 2012. It featured the duo discussing and investigating paranormal events. Segments included "Viewers Spooky Happenings", where the audience of the show would send in "scary" items for the video bloggers to react to, and "In The News This Week", where the duo recapped recent light-hearted news items and viral videos.

Lester also appeared alongside Howell in Benjamin Cook's twelve part web series Becoming YouTube, and was interviewed on the various topics Cook covered.

On 12 September 2014, Howell and Lester posted the first video on their new gaming YouTube channel, DanAndPhilGAMES. On 8 March 2015, the channel hit 1 million subscribers. It was officially the fastest growing channel on YouTube. DanAndPhilGAMES reached over 3.1 million subscribers. Popular recurring and annual series on this channel include their Sims 4 series, Spooky Week, and Gamingmas. The channel went on hiatus from December 2018 to October 2023.

On 1 April 2015, Lester and Howell launched a spin-off crafts-based channel, DanAndPhilCRAFTS, as an April Fools joke. It featured a single video of them creating square snowflakes out of paper, with an amateur editing style and humour throughout. It reached over 154,000 subscribers and 500,000 total video views in one week. Additional videos were uploaded on April Fool's Day in 2016 and 2017. On 1 April 2024, the channel returned with the video titled 'Slime', which emphasised the horror aspects present in the previous videos.

In 2019, The Sunday Times named Lester one of the top influencers in the UK. From 2019 to 2023, Lester focused on his solo content. He featured in an NHS Charities Together livestream in April 2020 and the YouTube original Hometown Showdown in November 2021. Lester was nominated for a 2021 British LGBT Award in the Online Influencer category, but encouraged viewers to support Abigail Thorn, who had come out as transgender earlier that year. Lester and Thorn both lost to Jessica Kellgren-Fozard.

In October 2025, Lester and Howell began hosting a weekly podcast, Hard Launch with Dan and Phil, on the rebranded Dan and Phil channel (formerly DanAndPhilGAMES). Hard Launch won the publicly-voted Listeners' Choice Award at the British Podcast Awards in October 2026.

=== Television and film ===
In 2007, Lester appeared as a contestant on The Weakest Link, making it to the final round. He also played the role of Tim in 2008 film Faintheart and appeared in a Confused.com advertisement later that year. At the time of making the advert, he had around 27,000 subscribers.

Lester was interviewed with other internet entertainers on Channel 4 News in October 2012 about the increased popularity of YouTube and video blogging as a profession.

In 2013 Lester and Howell appeared on Friday Download, a BAFTA award-winning CBBC programme.

From 2014 to 2016 Howell and Lester hosted the worldwide YouTube livestream of the Brit Awards as well as making backstage videos for their channel.

In 2015, Lester and Howell had voice cameo appearances in the UK cinema release of Walt Disney Animation Studios' Big Hero 6 as Technician 1 & 2. However, this version is not in the UK home release. That same year, the duo also guest-starred in fellow YouTuber PJ Liguori's online series Oscar's Hotel for Fantastical Creatures, voicing anthropomorphic food items Brie and Rash.

In December 2016, Howell and Lester voiced two gorilla princes named Majinuni and Hafifu respectively, in the episode "The Lost Gorillas" in Disney Junior's The Lion Guard.

=== Radio ===
In November 2012, the BBC announced that from January 2013 onwards, Lester and Howell would present the Sunday night entertainment and request show for national UK radio station BBC Radio 1. The duo had occasionally worked with Radio 1 before, making videos for the station's YouTube channel and presenting two Christmas broadcasts.

The show was designed to be an interactive, audio-visual broadcast involving music videos made by viewers, physical challenges performed on air by Howell and Lester, and song requests from listeners. It was streamed in a video, live on the BBC Radio 1 website, and accessible worldwide.

In August 2014, it was announced that the last Dan and Phil show would be broadcast on 24 August, with the duo moving to a different show on Monday nights, featuring other popular video bloggers. This new show was titled The Internet Takeover, and featured Lester alongside Howell live on the first Monday of every month, before coming to an end in April 2016.

=== IRL Merch ===
In 2014, Lester, Lester's brother, Martyn, and Howell co-founded IRL Digital, Ltd., a company that creates and sells the merchandise of various other media personalities, starting with Dan and Phil Shop and branching out from there.

==== Games ====
In August 2015, Howell and Lester created an app, The 7 Second Challenge, based on a YouTube challenge started by Lester in a 2014 video on his main channel. The app was discontinued in 2019. In October 2017, the duo released a party board game via Big Potato, Truth Bombs, also the brainchild of Lester.

=== The Amazing Book Is Not on Fire and The Amazing Tour Is Not on Fire ===
On 26 March 2015, Lester and Howell announced via a trailer on Howell's channel that they had co-written a book titled The Amazing Book Is Not on Fire (TABINOF). It was released in the UK on 8 October 2015, and worldwide on 15 October 2015, published by Ebury Press and Random House Children's Books. The book topped the General Hardbacks Sunday Times Bestsellers list having sold 26,745 copies in the UK in the first week of its release. It also became a No. 1 New York Times Bestseller in the young adult hardcover list.

In the same trailer the pair announced their theatrical stage show The Amazing Tour Is Not On Fire (TATINOF), which travelled around the UK during October and November 2015, ending with a show at the London Palladium. During the tour, they sung original song "The Internet Is Here", which they later released as a charity single for Stand Up To Cancer, earning them a gold record disc for the sales of the song.

In 2016, they took the tour to the US and Toronto, starting with a show in Orlando, Florida on 22 April and ended on 24 June with a show at the Dolby Theatre in Hollywood, California. It was the largest tour ever achieved by YouTube creators. They later toured Australia in August 2016, starting in Perth and ending in Brisbane, and finished the tour with a European leg, performing in Stockholm, Berlin, and Dublin.

=== YouTube Red Originals and Dan and Phil Go Outside ===
In October 2016, The Amazing Tour Is Not on Fire was released as a YouTube Red Original film by the same name along with a documentary, Dan and Phil's Story of TATINOF. They are the first British YouTube creators to release content on the YouTube Red platform.

Alongside these films, they released a photo book, Dan and Phil Go Outside, in November 2016, which includes a personal collection of candid photos and insightful stories from the tour. The book became a No. 1 New York Times bestseller.

=== Interactive Introverts ===
In November 2017, Lester and Howell announced their second tour, Interactive Introverts, a world tour that took place in 2018. The tour ran from April, starting in Brighton, to September, ending in Mumbai, and included 80 shows in 18 countries, including but not limited to Poland, the Philippines, Russia, New Zealand, Finland, and the Netherlands, making it one of the biggest YouTuber tours of all time.

Lester and Howell partnered with BBC Studios' TalentWorks to release a movie of Interactive Introverts with bonus features, such as behind the scenes content and director's commentary, on DVD, Blu-ray, and available for digital download in December 2018.

=== Terrible Influence ===
In June 2024, Lester and Howell announced their third joint tour and first since the return of their gaming channel titled Terrible Influence, which would begin that September in Antwerp. From there, the tour stretched from the remainder of 2024 into early 2025 with dates in mainland Europe, North America, Australia and New Zealand, and the UK and Ireland. Further UK dates were added in July 2024 due to demand.

== Personal life ==
Lester is gay. He came out online via a YouTube video in June 2019, though he had been open about his sexuality in his personal life since university. He started dating Daniel Howell in 2009 after meeting online. Howell was a fan of Lester's YouTube videos prior to their meeting. The pair publicly kept their relationship a secret for nearly 16 years before revealing it in October 2025. Before coming out as a couple, the nature of their relationship was the subject of speculation for many years. Lester has resided with Howell in London since 2012.

== Bibliography ==
- The Amazing Book Is Not on Fire (2015), co-written with Daniel Howell
- Dan and Phil Go Outside (2016), co-written with Daniel Howell

== Awards and nominations ==
=== Individual and other ===
In 2011, Lester won a Guinness World Record for fastest coin stacking, placing 25 coins on top of each other in 31.617 seconds.

Year	Show	Award	Nominee	Result	Ref
2013	Shorty Awards	Best YouTube Star	Phil Lester	Nominated	
2016	British Online Creator Awards	Creator of the Year	Phil Lester	Won	
2016	British Online Creator Awards	Collaboration of the Year	(With Hazel Hayes) Tipsy Talk with AmazingPhil	Nominated	
2021	British LGBT Awards	Online Influencer (Note: Threw support behind Abigail Thorn.)	Himself	Nominated	

=== With Daniel Howell ===
Year	Show	Award	Nominee	Result	Ref
2013	Sony Awards	Golden Headphones Award	Dan and Phil on BBC Radio 1	Won	
2014	Teen Choice Awards	Web Collaboration	The Photo Booth Challenge	Nominated	
2016	Shorty Awards	Best YouTube Ensemble	Dan and Phil	Nominated	
2016	Summer in the City Awards	YouTuber Book of the Year	The Amazing Book is Not on Fire	Won	
2016	British Online Creator Awards	Collaboration of the Year	Phil is not on fire 7	Won	
2016	British Online Creator Awards	Film of the Year	The Amazing Tour Is Not On Fire - Official Movie	Won	
2016	British Online Creator Awards	Film of the Year	Dan & Phil's Story of TATINOF	Nominated	
2016	British Online Creator Awards	Travel Video of the Year	A Day in the Life of Dan and Phil in AUSTRALIA!	Nominated	
2017	Summer in the City Awards	Creator Book of the Year	Dan and Phil Go Outside	Nominated	
2026	British Podcast Awards	Listeners' Choice Award	Hard Launch with Dan and Phil	Won	
