= 5th Shorty Awards =

Awards show for short-form social web media content

The 5th Annual Shorty Awards
- Date: April 8, 2013
- Location: The Times Center, New York City
- Hosted by: Felicia Day

The 5th Annual Shorty Awards ceremony featured Felicia Day, James Urbaniak, Kristian Nairn, Hannibal Buress, Carrie Keagan, Chris Hardwick, David Karp and Coco Rocha. 2.4 million tweeted nominations were made across all the categories to honor the top users on Twitter, Facebook, Tumblr, Foursquare, YouTube and other internet sites.

The ceremony took place on April 8, 2013 at the New York TimesCenter and was hosted by Actress Felicia Day. The show began with videos of Felicia Day exploring NYC's internet culture as well as Mayor Michael Bloomberg welcoming the audience with Internet-speak. During the night, Wolf Blitzer announced early poll results of what's trending during the Shorty Awards, and Jimmy Kimmel was given the Lifetime Achievement Award.

The audience was also shown an interview of the Mars Curiosity Rover, led by comedian and actor Seth Green, before accepting the Shorty Award for Foursquare Mayor of the Year.

== Fifth Annual Influencer Winners by category ==
Category	Winner
Best Actress	Selena Gomez, @selenagomez & Tara Strong, @tarastrong
Best Actor	Misha Collins, @mishacollins
Best Band	One Direction, @onedirection
Best Singer	Greyson Chance, @greysonchance
Best Celebrity	Justin Bieber, @justinbieber
Best in Celebrity Fashion	Selena Gomez, @selenagomez & Sophia Abrahão, @sophiaabrahao
Best Charity	Random Acts, @RandomActsOrg
Best Comedian	Rafinha Bastos, @RafinhaBastos
Best Fake Account	Charles_HRH, @Charles_HRH
Best Fansite	Sherlockology, @Sherlockology & 0ne-directi0n-updates
Best in Food	Rosanna Pansino, @RosannaPansino & Angela Davis, @TheKitchenista
Best in Gaming	Monark, @Monark & Felix Kjellberg, @PewDiePie
Best GIF Maker	T. Kyle MacMahon & Ryan Broderick
Best in Ireland	Bry, @Bry & Niall Horan, @niallofficial
Best Non-Human	Sarcastic Rover (Jason Filiatrault) @SarcasticRover
Best in Social Fitness	Cassey Ho, @blogilates
Best Video Blogger	PC Siqueira, @maspoxavida
Best Web Show	Bravest Warriors, @BravestWarriors
Best YouTube Star	Cauê Moura, @cauemoura
Keep Good Going Award	Kathy Zucker, @kathyzucker
Foursquare Mayor of the Year	NASA, @NASA
Quora of the Year	Kenyatta Leal
Tumblr of the Year	Texts from Hillary

== Fifth Annual Brand Winners by category ==
Category	Winner
Best Large Social Media Agency	360i, @360i
Best Location-Based Marketing	VH1 Save The Music
Best Mid-Sized Social Media Agency	Deep Focus, @deepfocus & Carrot Creative, @carrot & Suite Spot LLC
Best Overall Brand Presence on Tumblr	The Daily Show Election Center, @TheDailyShow
Best Social Media Manager	Andy Cohen, @BravoAndy
Best Social Media Presence of a CEO	Ian Schafer, @ischafer
Best Use of Social Media for Video Games	Benn Achilleas, @mrbennbenn & Martin Moore
Best Use of Facebook for Marketing	PandaQuest: Be the Next Chengdu Pambassador
Best Use of Promoted Tweet, Trend, or Account	Joe Pierce, Jordan Jacobson, Rachel Ford, Angelika Husmann, Jeanette Brown-Green & Jason Dolenga
Best Viral Campaign	Old Spice Muscle Music

== Special awards ==
Category	Winner
GIFStar Award	Michelle Obama, @FLOTUS
Real-Time Photo of the Year	Benjamin Lowy, @benlowy
Shorty Special Lifetime Achievement Award	Jimmy Kimmel, @jimmykimmel
