= Shaun (YouTuber) =

British YouTuber (born 1988)

- The logo of Shaun's channel
- Born: 16 June 1988 (age 38)
- Other names: Shaun and Jen

YouTube information
- Channel: Shaun
- Years active: 2016–present
- Genres: Political commentary; Video essay; Cultural critique
- Subscribers: 760 thousand
- Views: 86.7 million
- Last updated: 30 October 2026

Shaun (born 16 June 1988) is a British YouTuber. Video essays by Shaun have covered popular culture and politics, specifically to critique neoliberalism, anti-feminism, and the alt-right.

== YouTube career ==
Shaun began his current YouTube channel in 2016, and it is primarily funded through Patreon supporters. Shaun has made left-wing videos about the 2017 Unite the Right rally, the 1994 book The Bell Curve, the atomic bombings of Hiroshima and Nagasaki, politics in video games, Native American history, feminism and white supremacy. He has also created a video series called How PragerU Lies to You, which criticizes and responds to videos created by American conservative YouTube channel PragerU, and response videos to a controversial BBC article on trans women.

His video "Doom: The Fake Outrage" was named by Polygon as one of 2018's best video essays, with Polygon describing him as "quite possibly the most droll human on the internet".

Shaun has been included in an informal group of leftist YouTube essayists sometimes known as "BreadTube" or "LeftTube". This group also often includes Kat Blaque, ContraPoints, Hbomberguy, Lindsay Ellis, and Philosophy Tube.

In 2025, Shaun raised $453,112 for the Palestine Children's Relief Fund.
