= Noumenon (disambiguation) =

Noumenon is knowledge posited as an object that exists independently of human sense.

Noumenon or Noumena may also refer to:

== Literature ==
- Noumenon, a 1992 poetry collection by Evan Oakley
- Noumena, a novel series by Lindsay Ellis
  - Axiom's End, the first novel in the Noumena series
  - Truth of the Divine, the second novel in the Noumena series
- Noumenon, a 2017 novel by Marina J. Lostetter

=== Music ===
- Noumena (band), a Finnish melodic death metal band
- Noumenon, a 2005 album by Absurd Minds
- "Noumenon", a song by Nevermore from the 2003 album Enemies of Reality
- "Noumenon and Phenomenon", a song by Scar Symmetry from the 2009 album Dark Matter Dimensions

== Other uses ==
- Noumenon, a 1953 choreography by Alwin Nikolais
- Noumenon, a character by Charles Avery
- Noumenon, a 2006 sculpture by Steve Brudniak

== See also ==
- Numen (disambiguation)
- Numinous (disambiguation)
