= BreadTube =

Group of left-wing YouTubers

BreadTube, also called LeftTube, is a loose and informal group of online personalities who create video content, including video essays and livestreams, from socialist, social democratic, communist, anarchist, and other left-wing perspectives. BreadTube creators generally post videos on YouTube that are discussed on other online platforms, such as Reddit. Many BreadTube content creators are crowdfunded, and their channels often serve as introductions to left-wing politics for young viewers. BreadTube creators align with collectivist modes of governance, while opposing the alt-right and far-right.

== Origin ==
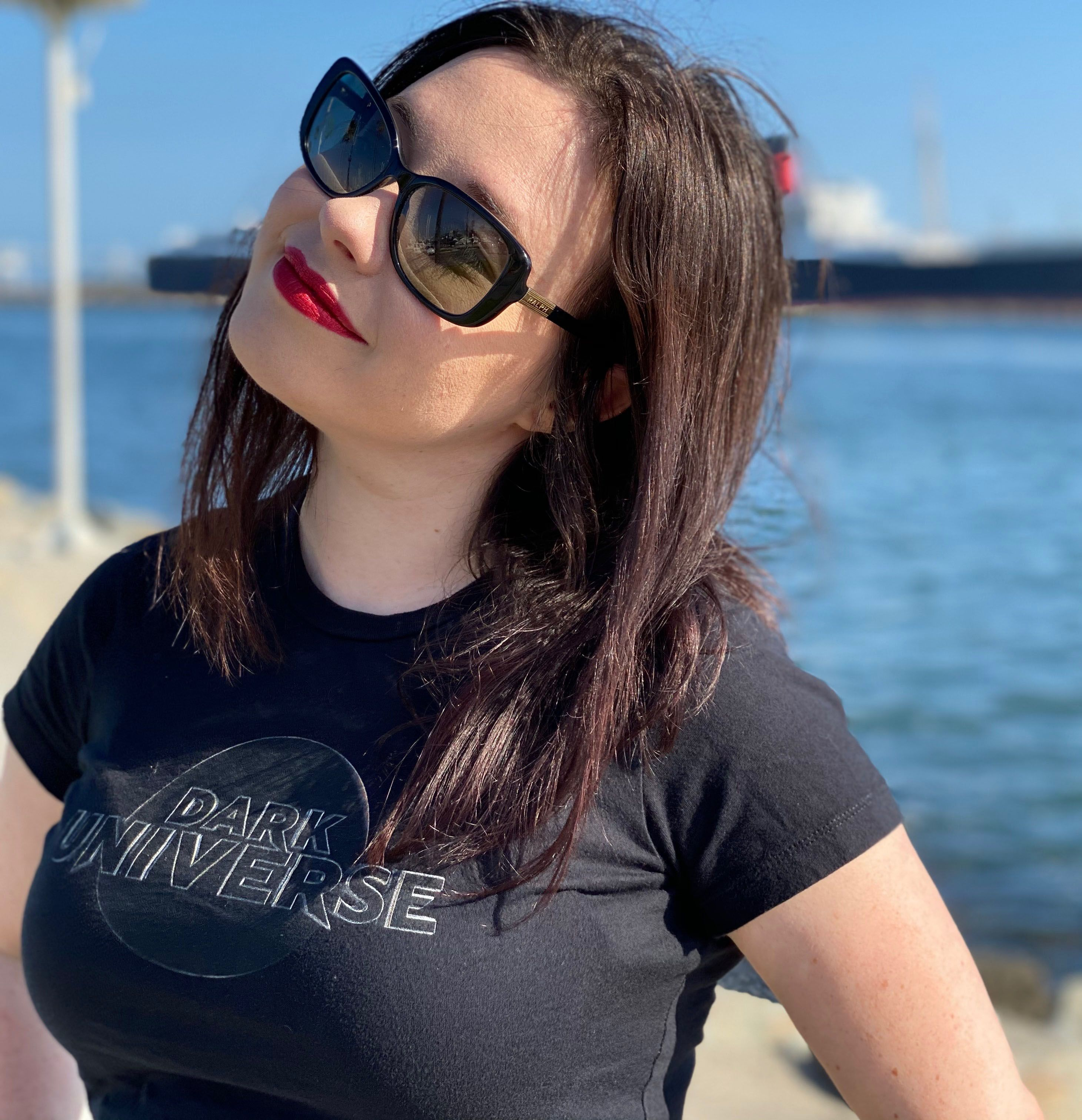
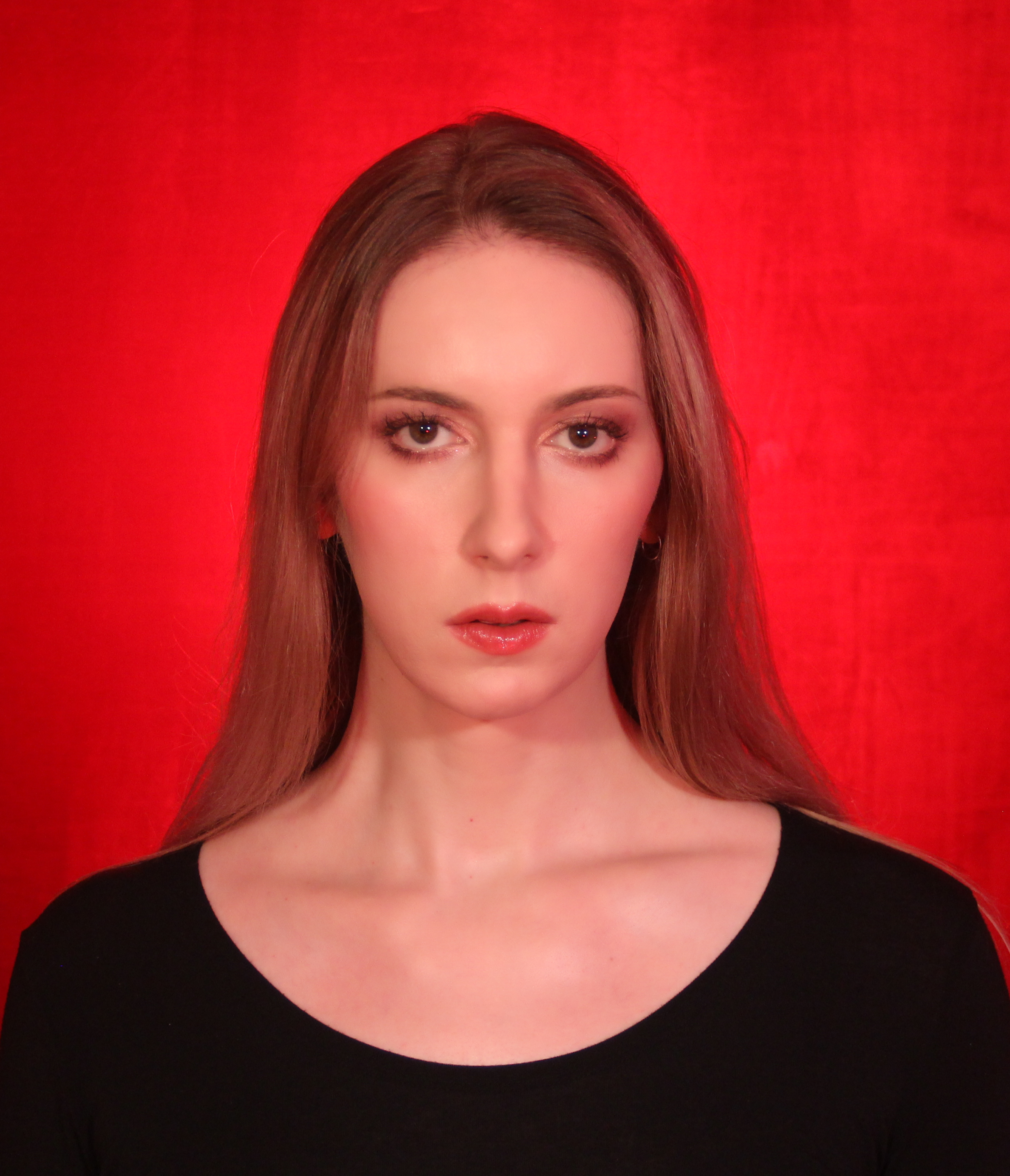
Lindsay Ellis (left) and ContraPoints (right), early BreadTubers

The term BreadTube derives from Peter Kropotkin's The Conquest of Bread, a book explaining how to achieve anarcho-communism and how an anarcho-communist society would function. Many BreadTube channels started in an effort to combat anti-social justice warrior and alt-right content that gained traction in the mid-2010s. By 2018, these individual channels had formed an interconnected community. Two prominent early BreadTubers were Lindsay Ellis, who left Channel Awesome in 2015 to start her own channel in response to the Gamergate controversy, and Natalie Wynn, who started her channel, ContraPoints, in 2016 in response to the alt-right's online dominance at the time. In an April 2021 interview, Wynn said, "The alt-right, the manosphere, incels, even the so-called SJW Internet and LeftTube all have a genetic ancestor in New Atheism."

== Format ==
BreadTube videos are often noted for their high production values and theatrical elements, running longer than many other YouTube videos. Many of them respond to right-wing talking points. Some sources indicate that right-wing and cyberlibertarian creators frequently take antagonistic stances toward political opponents, while many BreadTubers focus on analyzing and interpreting opposing arguments, sometimes incorporating elements of subversion, humor, or, in the words of Wynn, "seduction". Many BreadTubers aim to reach audiences beyond those who already hold left-wing viewpoints rather than merely "preach to the choir". Their videos often offer no definitive conclusions; instead, viewers are encouraged to interpret the presented material themselves. Because many BreadTube channels reference left-wing and socialist texts, some viewers encounter these ideas for the first time that way. According to Kelley Cotter, infighting is common in the BreadTube community. Cotter attributes that to "the community hosting a spectrum of beliefs, ranging from social democratic to Maoist".

== Channels ==
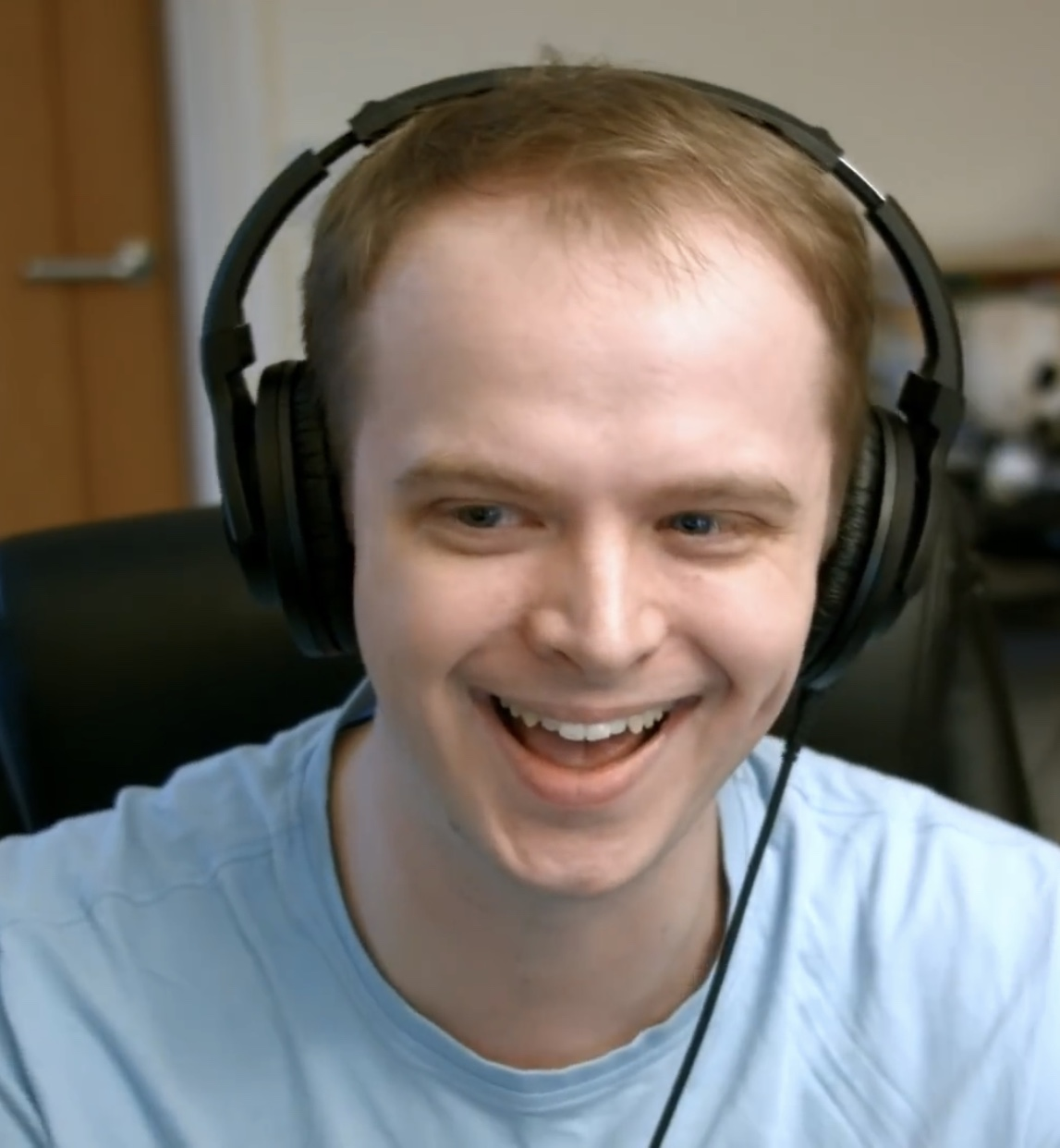
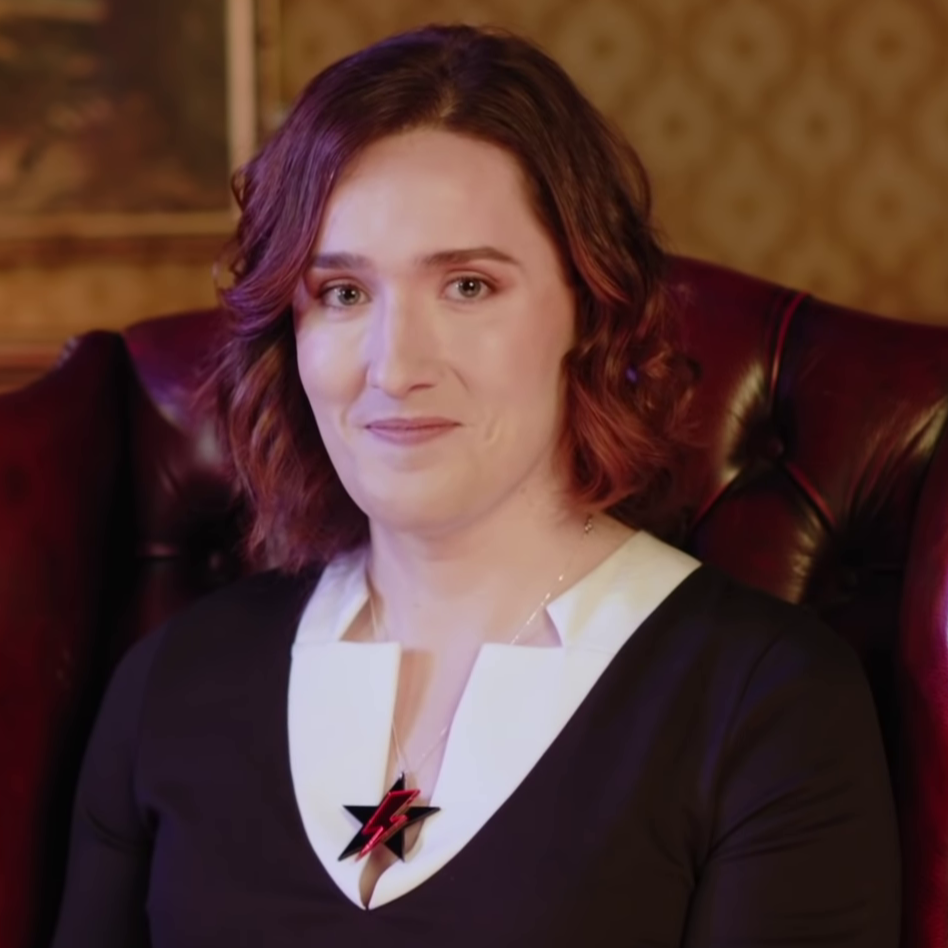
Hbomberguy (left) and Abigail Thorn (right), commonly described as BreadTubers

The vast majority of BreadTube content is in English, and most BreadTubers are American or British. The term is informal and often disputed, as there are no agreed-upon criteria for inclusion. According to The New Republic, in 2019, the five people most commonly mentioned as examples were the aforementioned Natalie Wynn and Lindsay Ellis, along with Harry Brewis (Hbomberguy), Abigail Thorn (Philosophy Tube), and Shaun, while Kat Blaque and Anita Sarkeesian are cited as significant influences; Ian Danskin (aka Innuendo Studios), Hasan Piker, Vaush, and Destiny have also been said to be BreadTubers. Among others, Ellis, Shaun, Wynn, and George have rejected the label.

== Reception ==
According to The Conversation, as of 2021, BreadTube content creators "receive tens of millions of views a month and have been increasingly referenced in media and academia as a case study in deradicalisation." According to The Independent, BreadTube "commentators have been trying, quite successfully, to intervene in the right-wing recruitment narrative – lifting viewers out of the rabbit-hole, or, at least, shifting them over to a new one." Kevin Roose wrote in The New York Times that BreadTube creators employ a method he called a kind of "algorithmic hijacking": they focus on the same topics content creators with right-wing politics discuss to get their videos recommended to the same people consuming right-wing or far-right videos, thereby exposing a wider audience to their perspectives.

=== Criticism ===
As a black BreadTuber, Kat Blaque has criticized the scarcity of them and argues the valuation of her work depends on white audiences. BreadTuber Kyle Kulinski (Secular Talk) has said that infighting in the community has made it "politically impotent and ineffectual". Some critics have argued that the commodified space's intentionally "ideologically ambivalent" character fundamentally undermines praxis.

BreadTube has also faced criticism for its internal divisions and contradictions. Kelley Cotter, in a 2022 study published in New Media & Society, examined the movement's fragmentation, identifying persistent infighting and ideological disagreements among its creators. Cotter also highlighted the contradictions between BreadTube's anti-capitalist principles and its dependence on YouTube's commercial infrastructure and advertising-driven algorithms, which incentivize competition between creators. Both Cotter and Marius Liedtke, in a 2025 study published in Publizistik, additionally documented criticism of the movement's predominantly white original creator base and the marginalization of non-white creators, some of whom reported negative experiences within the community. According to Cotter, these divisions are compounded by an informal hierarchy created by unequal visibility and popularity among creators, with a small number of prominent personalities receiving a disproportionate share of audience attention.

== See also ==
- Alt-right pipeline
