= MusicalSplaining =

American podcast about musicals

- Genre: Discussion; music; theater
- Format: Audio
- Language: English

Creative team
- Created by: Lindsay Ellis; Kaveh Taherian

Cast and voices
- Hosted by: Kaveh Taherian (2020–2023); Lindsay Ellis (2020–21); Angelina Meehan (2022–2023)

Production
- Length: ~60 minutes

Publication
- No. of seasons: 1
- No. of episodes: 80
- Original release: February 4, 2020 – December 26, 2023
- Provider: Amazon Music, Apple Podcasts, Spotify, Google Play, Stitcher, Nebula, Podchaser
- Updates: Every other Tuesday

Reception
- Ratings: Chartable

Related
- Website: Apple Podcasts

MusicalSplaining is a podcast hosted by filmmaker Kaveh Taherian and writer Angelina Meehan. Each episode, the two hosts are introduced to a different musical and they discuss its plot, themes and production. The podcast was pitched as a show for both musical-lovers and musical-haters. Prior to 2022, the show was hosted by Taherian and Lindsay Ellis.

== Overview ==
The format of the show leaned into the divisive nature of musicals, with Ellis or Meehan assuming the role of a musicals fan and Taherian a theatre skeptic. The episodes covered a mixture of classic musicals like The Phantom of the Opera and The King and I, and newer musicals including Frozen and SpongeBob SquarePants.

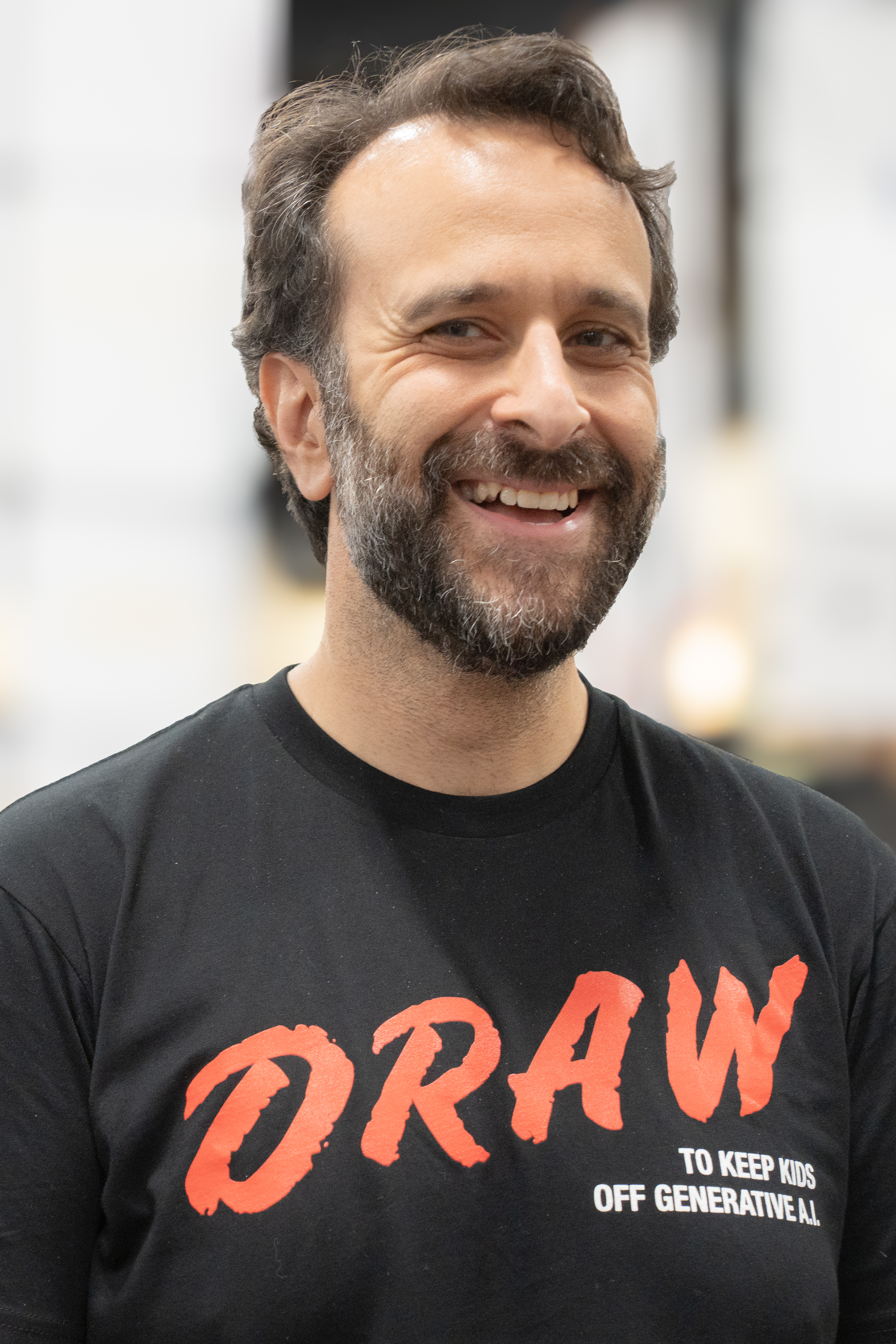
Kaveh Taherian at Comic Con Oakland 2026

Ellis and Taherian attended film school together at USC. Ellis stated that she chose Taherian as a co-host because he could balance his performative anger at musicals with a critical tone. The two hosts were sometimes joined by a guest host, which have included Hank Green and fellow YouTuber Jenny Nicholson.

Two months into the podcast, theatres in California shut down due to the COVID-19 pandemic. In an interview with OnStage Blog, Ellis described how the hosts had originally planned to tour around the state to see musicals in theatres, but COVID-19 "totally wrecked" those plans. They have since relied on proshoots to watch and review each musical.

The podcast is available via Amazon Music, Apple Podcasts, Spotify, Google Play, Stitcher, Nebula., and Podchaser.

On December 17, 2021, in "The Lion King" episode, it was announced that the show was going on an indefinite hiatus following Ellis's retirement from online content creation. The show returned on January 18, 2022 with an episode on the film Tick, Tick... Boom! with frequent guest and Ellis's former co-writer Angelina Meehan taking over as the podcast's new co-host.

On November 14, 2023, in the "Gypsy" episode, it was announced that the show would end by the end of the year. The show released the final episode on December 26, 2023.

== Episodes ==
Episode no.	Musical discussed	Guest host	Original podcast release date
1	Cats	—N/a	February 4, 2020
2	Frozen	Jenny Nicholson	February 18, 2020
3	Hadestown	—N/a	March 3, 2020
4	Beetlejuice	—N/a	March 17, 2020
5	The Phantom of the Opera	Angelina Meehan	March 31, 2020
6	Six	—N/a	May 5, 2020
7	Rent	—N/a	May 19, 2020
8	The King and I	—N/a	June 9, 2020
9	American Idiot	—N/a	June 23, 2020
10	Love Never Dies	Angelina Meehan	July 14, 2020
11	Hamilton	Hank Green	July 28, 2020
12	SpongeBob SquarePants	—N/a	August 19, 2020
13	Sweeney Todd: The Demon Barber of Fleet Street	Angelina Meehan	September 9, 2020
14	Ratatouille the Musical	—N/a	January 5, 2021
15	Moulin Rouge!	Angelina Meehan	January 19, 2021
16	Repo! The Genetic Opera	—N/a	February 2, 2021
17	The Sound of Music	—N/a	February 16, 2021
18	The Wizard of Oz	Antonella Inserra	March 2, 2021
19	O Brother, Where Art Thou?	—N/a	March 16, 2021
20	Om Shanti Om	Siddhant Adlakha	April 20, 2021
21	Descendants	Jenny Nicholson	May 4, 2021
22	Phantom of the Paradise	Angelina Meehan	May 18, 2021
23	Willy Wonka & the Chocolate Factory; Charlie and the Chocolate Factory (film)	—N/a	June 1, 2021
24	In the Heights	—N/a	June 15, 2021
25	Moana	Princess Weekes	June 29, 2021
26	Singin' in the Rain	—N/a	July 13, 2021
27	The Greatest Showman	Jenny Nicholson	August 3, 2021
28	Muppet Treasure Island	—N/a	August 17, 2021
29	Xanadu	—N/a	August 31, 2021
30	Mamma Mia! (film); Mamma Mia! Here We Go Again	Todd in the Shadows	September 14, 2021
31	Little Shop of Horrors (musical)	Elisa Hansen	October 5, 2021
32	Truth of the Divine (special episode)	Abigail Thorn	October 19, 2021
33	Wicked	Princess Weekes	November 9, 2021
34	Chicago	—N/a	November 23, 2021
35	The Lion King	Angelina Meehan	December 17, 2021
36	Tick, Tick... Boom!	(Angelina Meehan became a full-time cohost starting in this episode.)	January 18, 2022
37	Joseph and the Amazing Technicolor Dreamcoat	—N/a	February 1, 2022
38	Into the Woods	—N/a	February 15, 2022
39	Jekyll & Hyde	—N/a	March 1, 2022
40	West Side Story (1961 film); West Side Story (2021 film)	—N/a	March 15, 2022
41	Rock of Ages	—N/a	March 29, 2022
42	Jesus Christ Superstar	Emily St. James; Lindsay Ellis	April 12, 2022
43	Company (2006 revival)	Sarah Zed	April 26, 2022
44	All That Jazz	Josie Azzam	May 10, 2022
45	Annie	—N/a	May 24, 2022
46	Hairspray	—N/a	June 7, 2022
47	Waiting for Guffman	—N/a	June 21, 2022
48	Elvis	—N/a	July 5, 2022
49	Sunday in the Park with George	—N/a	July 19, 2022
50	The Last Five Years	—N/a	August 2, 2022
51	The Phantom of the Opera (2004 film)	Lindsay Ellis	August 16, 2022
52	Hair (1979 film)	—N/a	August 30, 2022
53	Amadeus (1984 film)	—N/a	September 13, 2022
54	My Fair Lady (1964 film)	—N/a	September 26, 2022
55	Oklahoma! (2019 revival)	—N/a	October 11, 2022
56	Hello, Dolly! (1969 film)	—N/a	October 25, 2022
57	Mary Poppins (1964 film)	—N/a	November 8, 2022
58	Across the Universe	—N/a	November 22, 2022
59	The Book of Mormon (musical)	Hannah Hillam	December 6, 2022
60	The Muppet Christmas Carol	—N/a	December 20, 2022
61	Diana: The Musical	—N/a	March 7, 2023
62	Mean Girls	—N/a	March 21, 2023
63	Matilda the Musical (2022 film)	—N/a	April 4, 2023
64	Natasha, Pierre & The Great Comet of 1812	Emily St. James	April 18, 2023
65	Shrek The Musical	Big Joel	May 2, 2023
66	Bad Cinderella	Princess Weekes	May 23, 2023
67	Rocketman (2019 film)	—N/a	June 6, 2023
68	Some Like It Hot (2022 musical)	—N/a	June 20, 2023
69	Popstar: Never Stop Never Stopping	—N/a	July 18, 2023
70	Cyrano (2021 film)	—N/a	August 1, 2023
71	Fiddler on the Roof (1971 film)	Austin Wintory	August 15, 2023
72	Les Misérables	Lindsay Ellis	September 5, 2023
73	Cinderella (1997 film)	Princess Weekes	September 19, 2023
74	Aladdin (touring production)	—N/a	October 3, 2023
75	South Park: Bigger, Longer & Uncut	Steven Ray Morris	October 17, 2023
76	Newsies (2017 pro-shoot)	—N/a	October 31, 2023
77	Gypsy (2015 revival)	—N/a	November 14, 2023
78	Notre-Dame de Paris	Amal El-Mohtar	November 28, 2023
79	Hedwig and the Angry Inch (film)	Lady Emily	December 12, 2023
80	Cabaret (musical)	Lindsay Ellis	December 26, 2023
