= Vaush =

American political YouTuber and livestreamer (born 1994)

- Kochinski in 2023
- Born: Ian Anthony Kochinski; February 14, 1994 (age 32); Los Angeles, California, U.S.
- Education: California State Polytechnic University, Humboldt (BA)
- Occupation: YouTuber

Twitch information
- Channel: vaushvidya
- Genres: Political commentary; Video gaming; Reaction
- Followers: 103 thousand

YouTube information
- Channel: @Vaush
- Years active: 2019–present
- Subscribers: 605 thousand
- Views: 576.8 million
- Vaush's voice On libertarianism's relationship with socialism Recorded February 2021
- Last updated: October 10, 2026

Ian Anthony Kochinski (born February 14, 1994), better known as Vaush (/vɔːʃ/ VAWSH), is an American left-wing YouTuber and former Twitch streamer. Kochinski started his online career as a member of streamer Destiny's community, before creating his Twitch channel and YouTube account in 2019. His content consists of commentary on various news and media topics, men's fashion, video games, economics, and urbanist policies. Debates and discussions with various political figures have been a large part of his channel. Noted for his confrontational style, use of memes, and mimicry of right-wing YouTubers, he is regarded as part of the BreadTube community.

Described as a progressive and libertarian socialist, Kochinski is considered a controversial figure online. He has received several bans on Twitch and criticism for various statements, and has also received praise for his sociological content, debates, and charity livestreams.

== Personal life ==
Ian Anthony Kochinski was born on February 14, 1994, in Los Angeles, California, and grew up in Beverly Hills. Kochinski studied sociology at Humboldt State University, graduating with a BA in 2018. Kochinski identifies as pansexual. He is autistic and also has ADHD. Vaush has also said that he was diagnosed as having bipolar disorder. On August 5, 2026, Vaush released a video announcing that he would be moving to the Netherlands to live with his partner. This caused his streaming schedule to change from the afternoon to the morning in North American time zones.

== Career ==
Kochinski has livestreamed debates with far-right figures such as Stefan Molyneux and Sargon of Akkad, which have millions of views. His first appearances online were in discussions with the political streamer Destiny, and encouraged by Destiny's audience he later began a Twitch channel of his own. He also created his YouTube account in January 2019. Kochinski felt that other members of the online left at the time were too academic to reach the demographic of insecure white men that he thought was most susceptible to online radicalization and he opted to instead create loud, angry content that he thought would be more likely to appeal to them. While appealing to what he calls "masculine tendencies", Kochinski has aimed to create an inclusive community and has comparatively high proportions of female, gay, and trans people in his audience.

Kochinski mimics the style of right-wing YouTubers and utilizes similar video titles so that his videos are suggested by recommendation algorithms to those at risk of radicalization, a common strategy employed by the left-wing BreadTube community on YouTube. He also uses memes and internet slang in his videos to appeal to the audience of primarily young people online. Listed as an example of a BreadTube channel, his content features himself discussing news events and contentious issues, and debating other political streamers from the left and right, often in a confrontational style aimed at making his opponent appear unintelligent, and often utilizing the research skills and knowledge he gained from his sociology education to back up his arguments. However, when engaging with conspiracy theorists, Kochinski generally does not spend much time on research or debunking debated topics, as he believes that taking a more amiable approach is better at influencing people away from such hardened views. His channel also features discussions and debates with offline figures, including journalists, radio hosts, and political candidates. By 2021, he amassed over 350,000 subscribers and 120 million views on his YouTube channel.

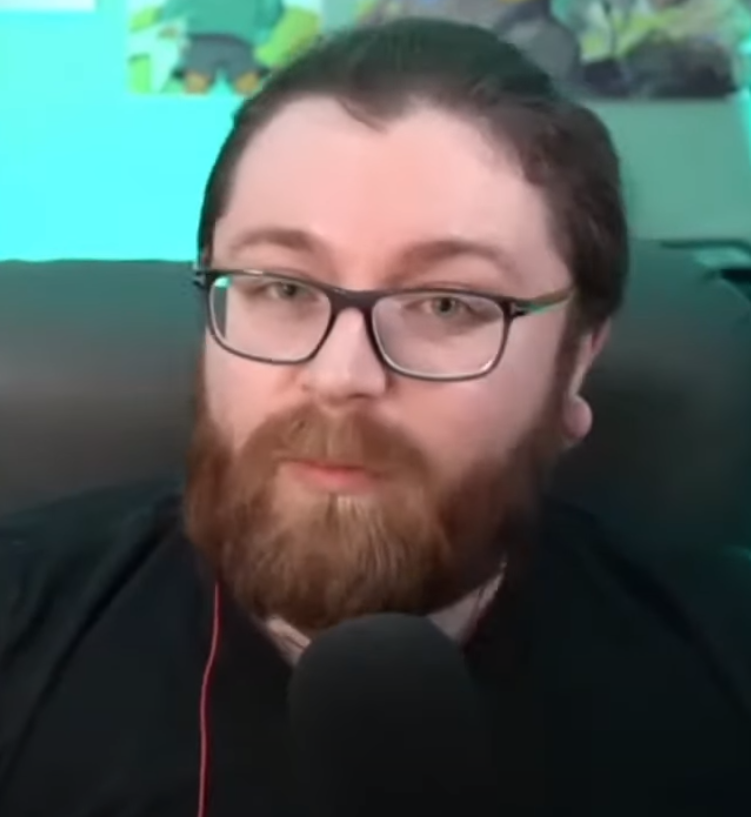
Kochinski in 2021

In 2019, he was banned from Twitch for saying that the US should invade Israel in defense of Palestinians, an incident which he later described as himself "going too far criticising Israeli imperialism". As a result, he transitioned to YouTube as his main platform, after having created his YouTube channel that January. In June 2019, Kochinski debated conservative YouTuber Hunter Avallone. Avallone later said he "got wrecked in [that] debate" and subsequent to the debate his views took a leftward turn, resulting in a video titled "Why I Left The Right". In December 2021, Kochinski was again banned from Twitch indefinitely for using the racial epithet "cracker" on stream. He used the term while discussing whether it could be considered a racial slur and if saying it should be a bannable offense following the ban of fellow Twitch streamer Hasan Piker for saying the word on stream. In response to the ban, Kochinski told The Washington Post that social media platforms are "terrible at acknowledging context and power relations when it comes to harassment."

Kochinski and fellow political streamer Destiny organized their communities to knock on more than 10,000 doors and make 50,000 phone calls in support of Janet Protasiewicz during the 2023 Wisconsin Supreme Court election. In a Progressive Victory livestream that September, Kochinski, along with Destiny, Emma Vigeland, and Keffals, interviewed U.S. Representative Ro Khanna about various topics, including the importance of youth political participation and ways to push progressive political sentiment.

== Political views ==
Noted as a left-wing streamer, Kochinski is a self-described progressive, anti-fascist, and libertarian socialist. He has also described himself as a "dirtbag leftist". In the 2020 United States presidential election, he opposed the "Bernie or Bust" movement and urged people to vote for Joe Biden, calling a refusal to vote "stupid" and motivated by "[an] incredibly narcissistic 'doomerism' that prevents people from engaging in meaningful action". Kochinski opposes the United States embargo against Cuba and supported the withdrawal of United States troops from Afghanistan. He also opposed Donald Trump's withdrawal of United States troops from Rojava. (Note: Jones, Owen (July 16, 2021). Vaush meets Owen Jones: US imperialism and the left. Archived from the original on September 5, 2021 – via YouTube.: Support of online advocacy and BreadTube: 0:54–4:23.; Opposition to the US embargo of Cuba: 20:28–21:28.; Support of US withdrawal from Afghanistan: 31:40–33:50.; Opposition to US withdrawal from Rojava: 36:33–37:45, 42:29–43:05.) While believing that tech companies have too much power, Kochinski also felt that Donald Trump being banned from various social media websites was an "unequivocally good thing". In 2022, Kochinski posted multiple videos and broadcast multiple livestreams condemning the Russian invasion of Ukraine.

Kochinski has criticized the online right for creating a "pipeline" that pushes people to radical hard-right views such as ethnic nationalism, disenfranchising women, and for engaging in "absolute abject cruelty to trans people". He has also criticized the online left for "purity politics" and for engaging in actions that create "great content but terrible political advocacy". Nonetheless, he believes that the left should engage in online advocacy because the internet allows for their message to reach a wider audience than any other medium and has argued that BreadTube has decreased the number of people online moving to the political right. Following the arrest of manosphere influencer Andrew Tate, Vaush argued that Tate's rise to popularity was due to the left failing to address the problems of young men and boys, saying they were being "pulled into fascism" because "the right talks to them and the left doesn't".

In May 2021, he opposed Twitch's use of the term "womxn", saying "There is already an inclusive term for trans women and cis women, and it's 'women' ... The only reason you [would not] believe that is if you don't believe trans women are women." He has criticized Twitter for banning trans people for using the term TERF, which he argues is "categorically not a slur".

== Reception ==
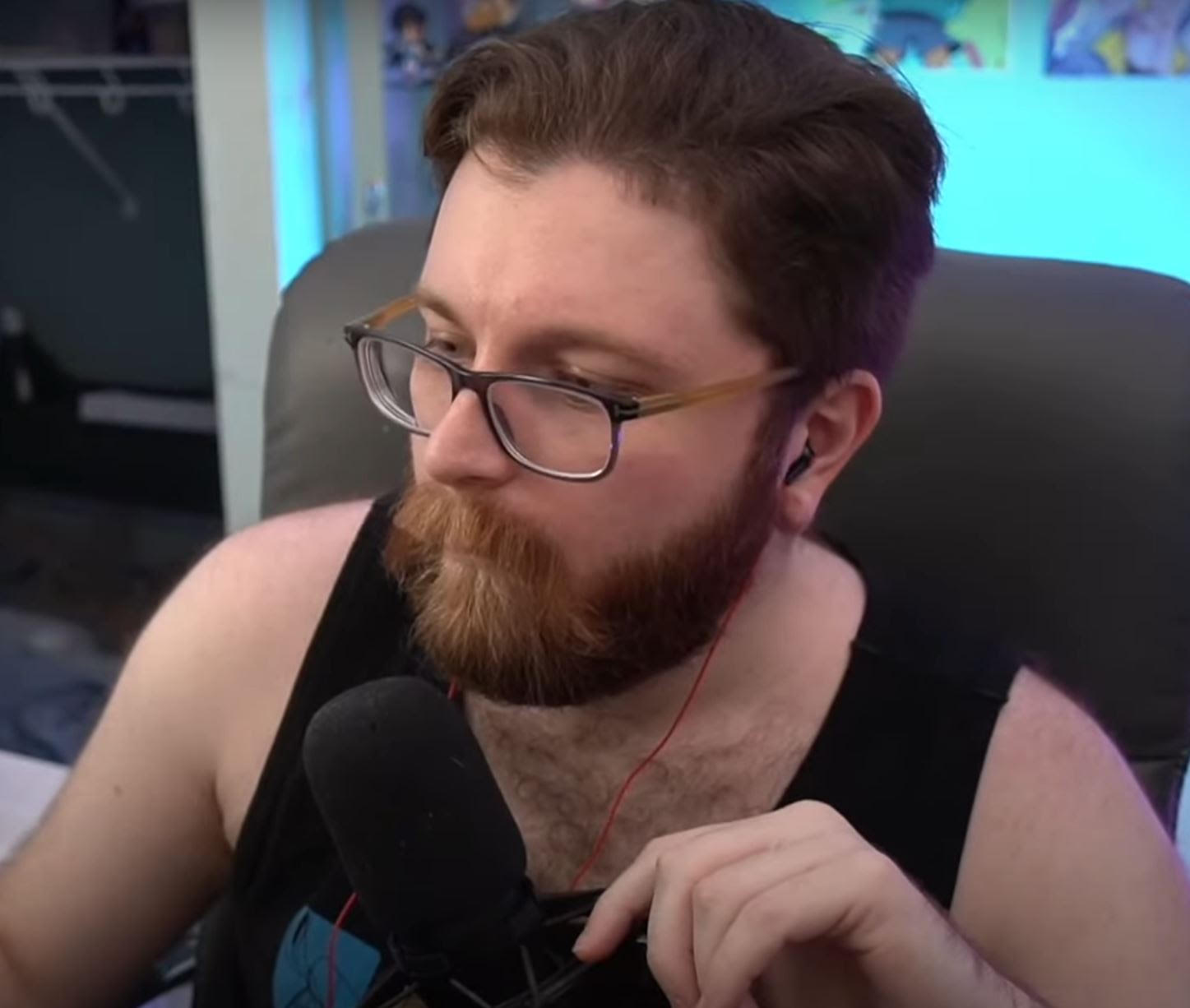
Kochinski in 2022

In 2021, controversy on Twitter surrounding Vaush was prompted by the reemergence of videos in which he justified his past uses of the word nigger and argued that the word is acceptable in certain contexts. Responding to the controversy on his livestream, Kochinski said that earlier statements that he had made had been a failed attempt at being "overly edgy" and that he "no longer stand[s] by" his arguments justifying the use of the word.

Later in 2021, his arguments that kink should be excluded from some pride events for not being family-friendly, and for making pride inaccessible to young questioning queer people were met with divided opinions on social media and criticism from writers for Vox, The Mary Sue, and The Bulwark, though he later renounced his statements, saying "[During the] kink at pride discourse, I said some stuff that I later came to regret. I think that there were some issues I was reactionary on ... kink at pride isn't a problem".

Also in 2021, Kochinski received praise from Kotaku for a charity livestream in which he raised over US$200,000 for the Palestine Children's Relief Fund and from The Daily Beast for challenging Tim Pool on the meaning of critical race theory while appearing on his podcast Timcast IRL. He was also positively cited by sociologist Anthony Knowles for successfully communicating sociological ideas to a large audience outside the reach of academic sociologists.

== See also ==
- BreadTube
- List of YouTubers
