= American Near East Refugee Aid =

American non-profit organization

Anera
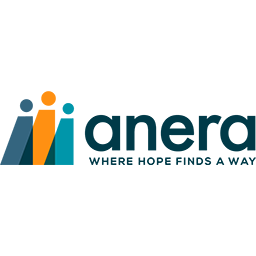
- Formation: 1968
- Type: 501(c)(3)
- Headquarters: Washington, D.C.
- Region served: West Bank, Gaza Strip, Lebanon, Jordan
- Key people: Sean Carroll (President & CEO)
- Revenue: $69,885,896
- Website: www.anera.org

American Near East Refugee Aid (Anera) is an American 501(c)(3) non-governmental organization that provides humanitarian and development aid to the Middle East, specifically the West Bank, the Gaza Strip, Lebanon and Jordan. Founded in 1968 in the aftermath of the Six-Day War, Anera initially sought to help the hundreds of thousands of displaced Palestinians by providing emergency relief. While still providing crisis response, Anera now also addresses the long-term economic and social needs of Palestinians, Lebanese and Jordanians through its health care, education, and job creation programs.

The largest American NGO operating in the West Bank and Gaza, Anera works closely with local institutions, such as schools, universities, health facilities, cooperatives, municipalities, grassroots communities, and charitable associations. Anera is funded by individual donors and grants from public and private institutions.

== Programs and activities ==
Through its programs that alleviate suffering and reduce poverty, Anera works to help people meet their fundamental necessities. Through both large-scale projects like building reservoirs and smaller projects like installing water tanks on the tops of homes, Anera has many programs that meet people's immediate needs and provide jobs at the same time. In 2011, Anera provided more than $65 million worth of programs to the people of the West Bank, Gaza, Lebanon and Jordan. In 2020, Anera provided over $100.4 million in programs. Historically, the organization has worked with regional governments to help address needs in times of crisis.

=== Health and relief ===
Anera has delivered emergency relief and medical supplies to communities in the Middle East. Anera has built 177 water cisterns and is building or repairing water networks and pipelines in the West Bank and Gaza.

=== Education ===
Anera helps to build new schools, offer after-school programs, train preschool teachers and principals, teach information technology, and support music education. During fiscal year 2007, Anera expanded its Gaza-based preschool teacher-training project to provide employment opportunities for skilled women while developing organizational skills, active learning techniques and communications skills among children.

=== Community and economic development ===
Anera offers community assistance in the form of infrastructure projects and job training programs to help people become entrepreneurs with access to small business loans and job opportunities. During fiscal year 2007, Anera's Emergency Water and Sanitation Project received nearly $4 million in grants from the U.S. Agency for International Development to respond to emergency water and sanitation needs in the West Bank and Gaza, and create short-term employment opportunities for impoverished Palestinian communities.

Anera's sponsors children between the ages of 4-17 to receive an education in one of seven schools in Lebanon, Gaza, or the West Bank. Students who participate in the scholarship program are orphans, come from impoverished households or require physical and rehabilitative support.

=== Sarra water project ===
In February 2008, Anera partnered with the United States Agency for International Development (USAID) in a project to install an internal water network in the village of Sarra in the West Bank. According to the USAID press release, the project "will ensure access to a reliable water supply ... [and will be] funded by USAID and implemented by Anera. The total cost of the project is $255,000 and is anticipated to generate 1,800 days of employment."

=== Gaza Food Security Program ===
Since 2010, the Gaza Food Security Program has constructed over 1,100 greenhouses in Gaza to improve healthy food access and increase the household income of marginalized and food-insecure families.

=== Gaza War (2023 – present) ===
On November 16, 2023, Palestine Children's Relief Fund awarded Anera, in partnership with World Central Kitchen, a $1.5 million grant to provide hot meals for distribution to displaced individuals in Gaza during the Gaza war. During the Gaza humanitarian crisis, Anera provided millions of hot meals and other humanitarian aid supplies to civilians throughout the strip. On March 8th, 2024, Anera's logistics coordinator, Mousa Shawwa, was killed by an Israeli airstrike. After seven World Central Kitchen humanitarian workers were killed by Israeli airstrikes on April 1, 2024, Anera deemed it unsafe for its workers to provide humanitarian aid and paused its ground operations in Gaza as of April 2. On April 11, the organization's chief executive, Sean Carroll, informed The New York Times that relief operations were resuming, with assurance from the IDF that it would take measures to protect the workers.

== Ratings ==
Anera is rated 4 stars by Charity Navigator, an independent evaluator of charities' fiscal management. The organization meets all twenty Better Business Bureau standards for charity accountability.

== See also ==
- Near East Foundation
