= Truth of the Divine =

2021 science fiction novel by Lindsay Ellis

- Author: Lindsay Ellis
- Audio read by: Abigail Thorn; Stephanie Willis; Kaveh Taherian
- Language: English
- Series: Noumena
- Genre: Science fiction
- Published: October 12, 2021
- Publisher: St. Martin's Press
- Publication place: United States
- Media type: Print (hardcover)
- Pages: 496
- ISBN: 9781250274540
- Preceded by: Axiom's End
- Followed by: Apostles of Mercy

Truth of the Divine is a 2021 science fiction novel by American author Lindsay Ellis, and the second novel in her Noumena series. It was published in October 2021 by St. Martin's Press.

The novel received a generally positive review from the British Science Fiction Association's John Dodd, who found the book "as compelling as the first.". Autostraddle's Amari Gaiter thought the novel "exemplifies the power of science fiction", while Booklist's Biz Hyzy wrote that Ellis's writing allows the reader to empathise with the main protagonist Cora.

Apostles of Mercy, the third book, was published on June 4, 2024, the third book out of five.

== Plot summary ==
A few months after their altercation with Obelus, Cora and Ampersand have grown closer as the former continues to translate the latter's needs to the US government. Since Cora's father, Nils Ortega, unveiled the existence of aliens to the world, the Cheney administration is debating whether to grant the ETIs (intelligent extraterrestrials) full human rights or to keep them detained. A "Third Option" put forward by congressman Jano Miranda is gaining traction among the American public, where ETIs are placed in a second-class category of citizenship, giving them limited human rights and required supervision by humans. When Cora takes Ampersand to meet with military officials and other amygdalines to discuss the Third Option, she flees with him back to her apartment after an altercation with the other amygdalines.

At her apartment, Cora and Ampersand witness an explosion in the sky, which Ampersand remarks is his last surviving symphile arriving on earth to kill him in a cultural murder-suicide. When Cora travels to the site of the explosion with CIA agent Sol Kaplan, she is transported by Ampersand to a cave, where he reveals that he has kept Obelus alive by placing him in Cefo's body, but without his memory. They are then interrupted by Kaveh Mazandarani, a journalist and human rights activist that work with Nils, who spotted her at the landing site and followed her. Ampersand's symphile finds the two of them but is quickly incapacitated by Cora's pulse emitter and detained in the cave. Obelus escapes in the commotion, so Ampersand leaves Cora to watch Kaveh and his symphile while he searches for Obelus.

Kaveh bonds with Ampersand's symphile, which he names "Nikola", and tells Cora he wishes to help her oppose the Third Option since he worries it may be used to restrict the rights of other humans. Frustrated with the apathy of the military towards the aliens, Cora quits her job and starts working closely with Kaveh to publicly advocate against the Third Option, bringing them closer as friends and quickly lovers. Later that night, she goes to free Nikola since he is making her doubt the things Ampersand is telling her. Nikola transports them to Death Valley, where he explains the metaphysical aspects of the conscious mind and that the bond Ampersand formed with Cora to save her from death supposedly is much more complicated than he says. Ampersand arrives to retrieve Cora, but is tracked by Obelus's Similars, who have remained on Earth to return Obelus to the Superorganism, the amygdaline leaders, and kill Ampersand. Nikola drives away the Similars and they all return to Kaveh's home, where Ampersand tells Cora that he formed their bond as a test to see if humans were a capable species and if it was possible to bond with them.

Nikola, fascinated with humanity, travels to downtown Los Angeles to converse with humans at a pro-Third Option rally led by Jano Miranda, however, he and Ampersand, who arrived to retrieve the former, are incapacitated by the Gadsden Line, a human supremacist militia, with an EMP device. Cora's defense of Ampersand from the gunmen gains her global fame before she and the amygdalines are evacuated by Sol to a military base. At the base, Nikola reveals to Kaveh and the military that the Superorganism will likely reach Earth within 10–15 years, rather than a few centuries as thought previously, to exterminate humanity as a perceived threat. However, he offers Kaveh the chance to travel with him to another planet and use genetic material to restart humanity someplace else. As Kaveh contemplates this revelation, he spends more time with Cora, helping her through her mental issues and suicidal thoughts.

Nils calls Kaveh and threatens to blackmail him unless he gives him information about the amygdalines, so Kaveh reluctantly tells him about Obelus's attack against Cora and the CIA in Virginia. Ampersand disappears from federal custody to search for Obelus, while Cora is called to testify before a Senate committee hearing discussing the Third Option. Senator Todd Julian, an aspiring presidential candidate and champion of the Third Option, chastises Cora during her testimony and unveils the information Nils leaked to him, and casts Cora as being responsible for Obelus's killing of CIA agents, turning public trust against her and amygdalines. Nikola transports her from the Senate building to a hangar in California so that she may help him find Ampersand and Obelus.

After Kaveh reunites with Cora, they determine that Ampersand will travel to a military facility in San Bernardino, California where Sol will be transporting Obelus's old body, and that he will likely retrieve it to restore Obelus's form. Cora and Kaveh get there at the same time as Nikola to meet with the arriving Ampersand and Obelus, but they are interrupted by the arrival of Obelus's Similars. Cora threatens them using her pulse emitter, forcing the Similars to leave Earth with Obelus and his body, but she is soon attacked by Gadsden Line militiamen who were loitering the base. Kaveh is shot and killed in the attack, devastating Cora and causing an enraged Nikola to kill the militiamen. After waking up in a hospital, she leaves for the hangar to prevent Nikola and Ampersand from going through the murder-suicide, successfully pulling Ampersand back from the edge and putting Nikola in a coma. Ampersand offers Cora the same option Nikola gave Kaveh of leaving Earth to start humanity anew, and, after seeing the polarized national response to Kaveh's murder, she agrees to go with him.

== Release ==
The book was released as an audiobook by Macmillan Audio, with narration by Abigail Thorn, Stephanie Willis, and Kaveh Taherian. Willis and Taherian portray the female and male characters, respectively, while Thorn voices the news reports.
