= Progressive Victory =

Socialist political organization & community

- Abbreviation: PV
- Leader: Benjamin Gilbert-Lif
- Standing Committee: Progressive Victory Action (501(c)(4)); Progressive Victory PAC (Hybrid PAC)
- Founder: Sam Drzymala
- Founded: July 21st, 2022
- Student wing: Progressive Victory at FSU
- Membership: 17,000
- Ideology: Democratic Socialism (US) Progressivism (US)
- Political position: Left-wing

Website
- www.progressivevictory.win

Progressive Victory (PV) is a socialist political organization in the United States. It was founded in 2022 by Sam Drzymala in collaboration with the leftist livestreamer Vaush and is known for progressive political organizing that combines online creator communities with electoral field work such as canvassing and voter outreach. As of May 2026, Progressive Victory has reported having over 17,000 members and 1,600 dues paying members.

== History ==
Progressive Victory was founded by Sam Drzymala in partnership with Vaush on July 21st, 2022. Originally billed as PV22, it launched with the goal of getting the audiences of left-aligned content creators to “touch grass”, build community, and engage politically.

Looking for help to establish relationships with Hasan Piker & Destiny, the remaining two of the so-called “Big Three” left aligned live streamers, in late 2023 PV briefly hired Brianna Wu before they had a falling out in December 2023.

From 2023 to 2024, the organization established their media strategy and expanded its creator roster to include Pokimane, Valkyrae, AustinShow, Destiny, Emma Vigeland, Dylan Burns, Ryan Grim, Counterpoints, and others. Upon the conclusion of the 2024 presidential election, they scuttled their broader media program saying citing difficulty working with creators who don’t align with their “leftist values”

Most recently they have associated with Vaush, Hasan Piker, Krystal Ball, Dylan Burns, and The SoyPill.

Media coverage has described Progressive Victory as part of a broader effort by progressive activists to build political infrastructure in online spaces, particularly through livestreams and creator-led communities. In 2024, The Washington Post described the PAC as being focused on digital political organizing. According to Wired, Progressive Victory is a "group that works with streamers on get-out-the-vote initiatives".

== Organizing model ==
Progressive Victory has been described as using internet personalities and livestreaming communities as a channel for political communication, voter persuasion, and volunteer mobilization. Drzymala has said that the back-and-forth conversation of a livestream, as opposed to the one-sided nature of a stump speech, can change someone's mind about a political issue.

Coverage of the organization has placed it within a wider trend of campaigns and political groups attempting to reach younger audiences through alternative media, online creators, and livestream platforms rather than relying solely on traditional campaign communications. Coverage by WHSV on youth voter outreach during the 2024 election cycle identified Progressive Victory as one of the groups active in efforts to engage younger voters through civic-participation events and alternative political media.

== Activities ==
In 2022, Progressive Victory launched its State Organizing Program with Vaush and achieved 290,000 voter contacts and 10,000 doors knocked in the 2022 Georgia Senate Run-Off election.

In 2023, Progressive Victory flew out Vaush, Destiny, Emma Vigeland, and Ryan Grim to D.C. for TwitchCon and an interview with Congressman Ro Khanna.

From February to November 2024, Progressive Victory ran its Canvass House Program in partnership with political streamer Destiny. The program saw them maintain 7 canvass houses each in key swing states. Each house knocked 10,000 doors each month and helped PV achieve a $1 per door knock cost, a figure which significantly undercuts the industry average of $8.

From February to September 2024, PV’s Canvass Convention Program saw them host five large canvassing events each centered around and fundraised by either Vaush or Destiny. The most notable of which was a July 2024, event held in New York on behalf of Jamaal Bowman which saw Vaush and his community knocked 10,562 doors in a single afternoon.

In October 2024, Progressive Victory organized a Twitch stream featuring Senator Bernie Sanders and creators Pokimane, Valkyrae, AustinShow, and Sykkuno in support of Kamala Harris's presidential campaign. The Washington Post reported that the event was organized by Progressive Victory and framed it as part of Democratic efforts to compete for younger online audiences. Additional coverage of the October 2024 event appeared in Kotaku, which reported that the stream formed part of a broader Democratic effort to reach younger voters through Twitch and YouTube creators.

By the end of 2024, Progressive Victory’s three organizing programs contributed to 1,600,000 total voter contacts and 340,000 door knocks, according to founder Sam Drzymala, in the year 2024.

In late 2025, in collaboration with Vaush, Progressive Victory held both a canvassing event and an interview (led by Vaush) with Katie Wilson, nominee for and the eventual Mayor of Seattle.

Concurrent with the 3rd No Kings protest on March 28, 2026, Progressive Victory hosted a virtual "Choose Your Fighter" rally which featured appearances by progressive and left-wing figures including Hasan Piker, Vaush, Krystal Ball and Ryan Grim of Breaking Points among others, as well as 2026 United States election candidates including Abdul El-Sayed.

In November 2026, Progressive Victory and Vaush held a five-hour, live-streamed phonebank for PV Pledge candidate Angie Nixon, in which she made an appearance. Making 180,237 phonebank dials with 297 volunteers attending, Progressive Victory reported that it was the most successful phonebank in the organization’s history calling every single registered Democrat in Florida’s 26th Congressional District in under two hours. In a press release following the event, PV stated that this event marked the first time anyone has ever phonebanked every registered Democrat in a large congressional district.

Following the 2026 midterm elections, Progressive Victory would announce that their members accomplished 1.1 million phonebank dials across twenty-one campaigns for candidates including Abdul El-Sayed, Oliver Larkin, Melat Kiros among others. Of the twenty-one candidates they supported nationally, eight of them were elected. The most notable of which being Congresswomen Analilia Mejia, who was among the first to take the PV Pledge that launched earlier in the year.

== See also ==
- Progressivism in the United States
- Online activism
- Twitch
