= Numen (disambiguation) =

Numen is a Latin term for "divinity", "divine presence", or "divine will".

Numen or Numina may also refer to:

== Gaming ==
- Numen: Contest of Heroes, a 2010 video game
- Numen, a fictional supernatural ability in the role-playing game Geist: The Sin-Eaters

== Literature ==
- Numen (journal), an academic journal of the International Association for the History of Religions
- Numen, Old Men, a 2009 book by Joseph Gelfer
- Numina, a fictional organization in the fictional civilisation The Culture

== Music ==
- Numen (band), a Spanish progressive rock band
- "Numen", a song by Guano Apes from the 2014 album Offline
- Numen Records, an English record label founded by Mozez

== Religion ==
- Nine Numina, a group of spirits related to the Queen Mother of the West
- Numen of Africa, a divinity seen by Curtius Rufus
- Numen praesens, the divine presence of the Roman emperor in the Roman imperial cult
- Numenism, another name for animism

== Television ==
- Numen International, an Italian television production company founded by Clarissa Burt
- Numen Kingdom, a fictional kingdom in the television series Century Sonny

== See also ==
- Noumenon (disambiguation)
- Numinous (disambiguation)
