= Numinous (disambiguation) =

Numinous means "arousing spiritual or religious emotion; mysterious or awe-inspiring"; also "supernatural" or "appealing to the aesthetic sensibility".

Numinous may also refer to:

- Numinous legitimacy, political legitimacy of a state based on divine ordination
- Numinous mushroom, another name for the lingzhi mushroom
- Numinous Negro, a term coined by Richard Brookhiser based on the previous term Magical Negro
- Numinous Pivot, an English title of the Lingshu Jing, a Chinese medical text
- Numinous experience, another name for a religious experience
- Numinous Way, the spiritual philosophy of David Myatt
- School of the Numinous Treasure, another name for the Lingbao School

== See also ==
- Noumenon (disambiguation)
- Numen (disambiguation)
