= Again Again (film) =

- Directed by: Mia Moore; Heather Ballish
- Screenplay by: Mia Moore
- Produced by: Cliff Noonan; Mia Moore; Lilly Wachowski
- Starring: Mia Moore; Aria Taylor; Abigail Thorn; Nicole Spacek; Jon Meggison
- Cinematography: Laffrey Witbrod
- Edited by: Angelica Arellano
- Music by: Chloe Iris; Mia Moore
- Release date: 2026
- Running time: 99 minutes
- Country: United States
- Language: English

Again Again is a 2026 science fiction film directed by, produced by, and starring Mia Moore in her directorial debut. It is co-directed with Heather Ballish and is co-produced with Lilly Wachowski and Cliff Noonan. It co-stars Aria Taylor and Abigail Thorn. The film is set and filmed in Aberdeen, Washington.

== Plot ==
Aggie (Mia Moore) is a trans woman who has just emerged from being trapped re-living the same day in a time loop for the past 10 years. She uncovers the mystery of what caused her time loop while she confronts the anxiety of living in a world with consequences while simultaneously struggling with her relationship with her cisgender girlfriend Tess (Aria Taylor) and her relationship with another trans woman, Naomi (Abigail Thorn), who Aggie knows intimately, but only inside the time loop.

== Cast ==
- Mia Moore - Aggie
- Abigail Thorn - Naomi
- Aria Taylor - Tess

== Production ==
Moore stated that the screenplay for Again Again was inspired by her feelings of agoraphobia brought on by the lockdowns during the COVID-19 pandemic. During the process of crowdfunding the film, Moore reached out to Lilly Wachowski who sent her $5,000 to support the film's production. After the film was shot, Moore asked if Wachowski could provide feedback and advice. Wachowski accepted and became an executive producer on the film.

The film was also inspired by other time loop movies including Groundhog Day, Palm Springs, and Happy Death Day and intends to explore and subvert tropes in the genre of time loop films. According to Moore, “The movie starts the day after Agatha breaks out of her time loop. I wanted to sort of tell a story that assumes that you've seen all of those movies already. You can watch this movie and sort of fill in the blanks of what Agatha's experiences were like.”

== Reception ==
Seattle Gay News said the film "tasks its characters to live their lives as if today were their last and the unknown possibilities of tomorrow were far from a given. And it wants everyone in the audience to do the same. It's scary stuff. It's also beautiful. This is one of the year's best films." Brent McKnight rated the film an "A", saying "it's compelling to watch in the dreamy, meditative, sweet, earnest, achingly romantic package that is Again Again."
