= Lindsay Ellis =

American author and film critic (born 1984)

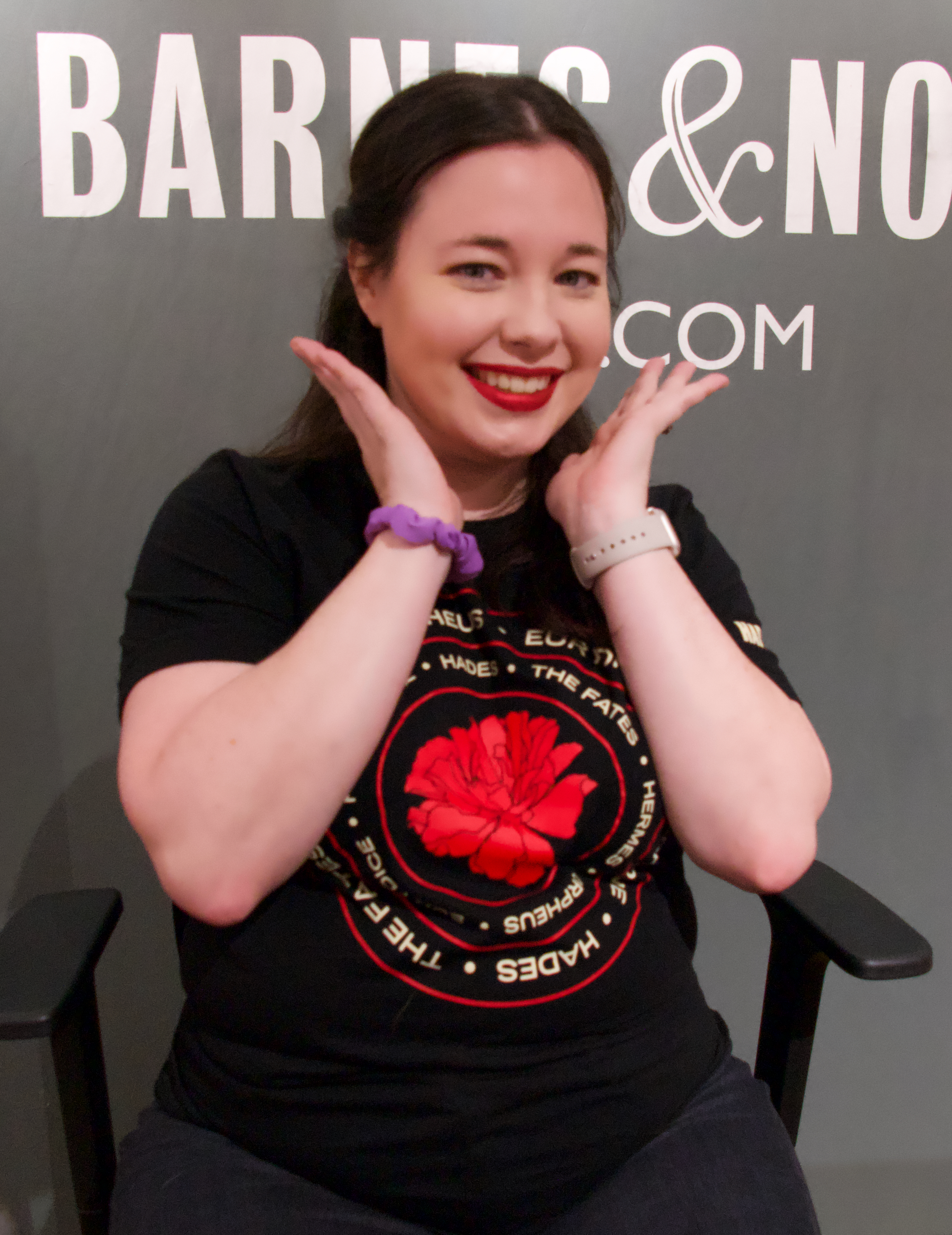
- Ellis at a book signing for Apostles of Mercy (2024)
- Born: Lindsay Carole Ellis; November 24, 1984 (age 41); Johnson City, Tennessee, U.S.
- Education: New York University (BA); University of Southern California (MFA)
- Occupations: Author; film critic; video essayist; YouTuber
- Years active: 2008–present
- Notable work: Axiom's End
- Spouse: Nick Hansen (m. 2019)
- Children: 2

YouTube information
- Channel: Lindsay Ellis
- Years active: 2008–2022, 2024–present
- Genres: Film criticism; video essay; science fiction
- Subscribers: 1.32 million
- Views: 161.2 million
- Last updated: September 12, 2026
- Website: lindsayell.is

Lindsay Carole Ellis (born November 24, 1984) is an American science fiction author, video essayist, film critic, and YouTuber. Her debut novel, Axiom's End, published in July 2020, became a New York Times Best Seller.

== Early life ==
Ellis was born Lindsay Carole Ellis on November 24, 1984, in Johnson City, Tennessee, where she was also raised. She is the only child of school counselor, Sue (née Andes) and Navy Veteran, musician, educator, and contractor, James C. Ellis (1943–2015), During her teenage years, she met her future collaborators Antonella "Nella" Inserra, Elisa Hansen, and Angelina Meehan on fanfiction.net.

== Education and career ==
Ellis attended Science Hill High School in Johnson City. Ellis received her BA in Film Studies from New York University in 2007, followed by an MFA from the USC School of Cinematic Arts in 2011.

Along with her friends Elisa Hansen and Antonella Inserra and viewers of her video series 50 Shades of Green, Ellis wrote Awoken, a paranormal romance parody of Twilight, about a woman falling in love with Cthulhu, under the alias Serra Elinsen.

In 2010, Ellis wrote and directed the documentary short film The A-Word about women's experience with abortion. The film was screened at the IFC Center as part of its 2012 DocuWeek showcase.

=== Nostalgia Chick (2008–2014) ===
From 2008 to 2014, while also studying for her MFA, Ellis was selected to host The Nostalgia Chick as part of the Channel Awesome production company, a web series based on the Nostalgia Critic. She went on to create over 100 videos as part of the series before leaving in 2014 to focus more on long-form video essays.

=== Video essays (2014–present) ===
On her YouTube channel, Ellis has frequently made videos about Walt Disney Pictures films. Other works include "The Whole Plate", a long-running series examining the Transformers film series and the work of Michael Bay, which has received more than 4 million views, and a three-part series about the production of The Hobbit trilogy and its effect on the New Zealand film industry. Her Loose Canon series explores derivations of literary and film characters over time. Since 2017, her focus on her channel has been on video essays about films. Ellis says she most enjoys thinking about "things that are deeply flawed but have this really interesting potential". Her videos are created with a small team of part-time staff. In addition to covering film topics, she has also created videos on being a YouTube content creator.

Ellis also co-hosts the It's Lit! web series, alongside fellow YouTuber Princess Weekes, for PBS Digital Studios, which explores trends in American literature as a companion piece to The Great American Read on PBS itself.

The three-part documentary The Hobbit Duology (2018), which Ellis wrote and edited with Angelina Meehan, was a finalist for the 2019 Hugo Award for Best Related Work.

Ellis was one of the founders of the Standard creator community along with Dave Wiskus, CGP Grey, Philipp Dettmer, and many other creators. Through Standard, she has released most of her content on Standard's Nebula streaming video service, including an extended cut on Tom Hooper's Les Misérables. She releases content early on Patreon, where she has over 9,000 patrons, making her one of the top 50 creators on the platform.

Throughout her career online, Ellis has been subject to multiple campaigns of online harassment. One such campaign occurred after she compared the film Raya and the Last Dragon to Avatar: The Last Airbender on Twitter, which detractors perceived to be a racist generalization of media featuring Asian people. In a 2021 Patreon blog post titled "Walking away from Omelas" (an allusion to the short story "The Ones Who Walk Away from Omelas" by Ursula K. Le Guin), she announced her retirement from YouTube and content creation, citing cancel culture and online harassment.

In June 2022, Ellis resurfaced publicly at Vidcon, where she discussed her life following her online retirement and the impact it had on her own mental health. She made the same accusations of harassment.

Ellis announced through her Patreon that, while she still intended to never return to YouTube, she would be releasing new content exclusively through Nebula, with her patrons getting free access as a Patreon perk. In October 2022, Ellis posted her first video essay in nearly one year on streaming platform Nebula, discussing the Lord of the Rings film trilogy.

In 2024, Ellis returned to YouTube, while still continuing to publish video content on Nebula. In 2025, Ellis released a video covering Ms. Rachel and the Gaza genocide on which she raised over $850,000 for the Palestine Children's Relief Fund.

=== Noumena (2020–present) ===
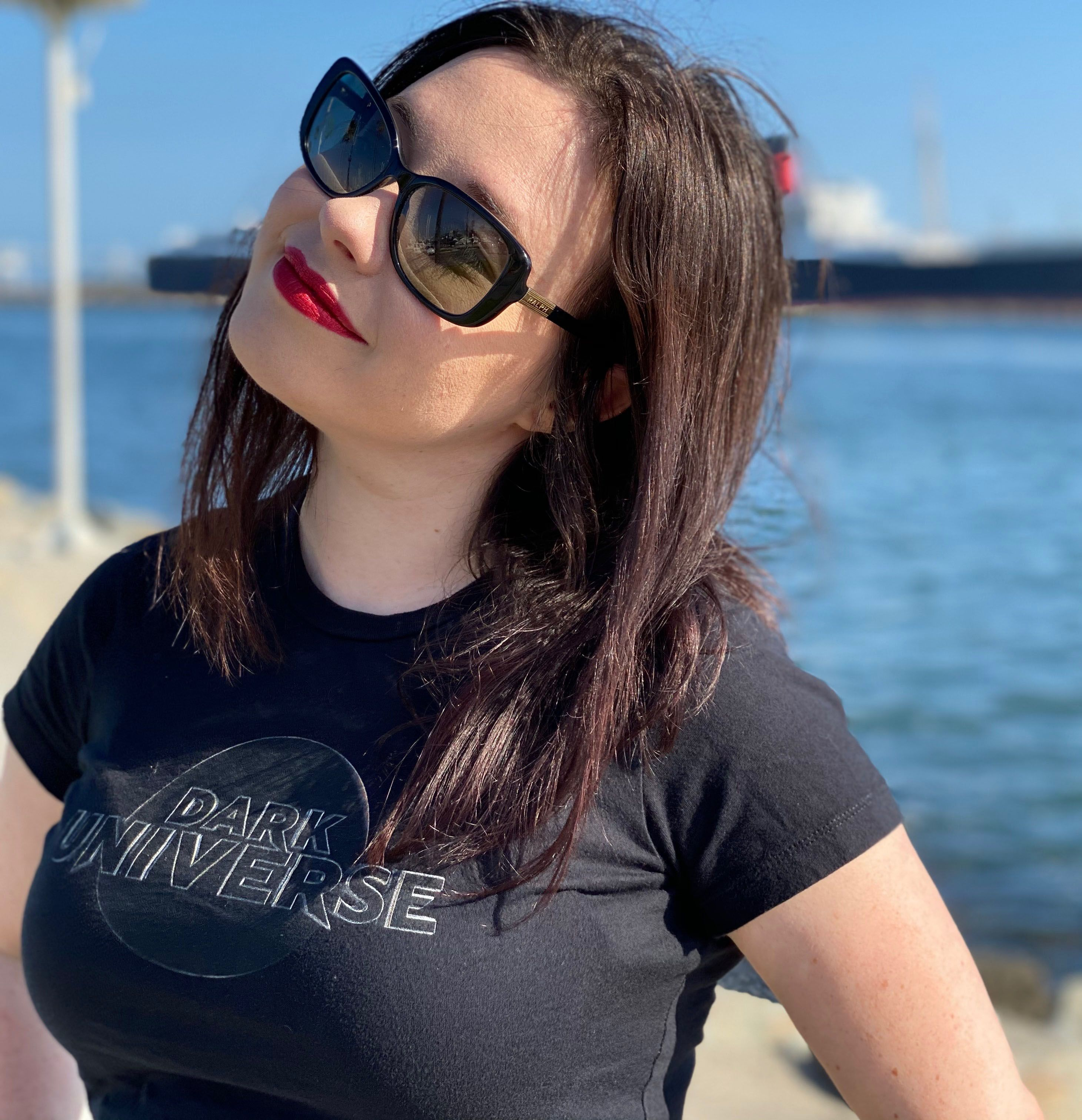
Ellis in 2020

In early 2020, Ellis co-founded MusicalSplaining, a podcast in which she, accompanied by director and illustrator Kaveh Taherian, discussed a different musical every two weeks. It was included in O, The Oprah Magazine's top 20 new podcasts of 2020.

Ellis' debut novel, Axiom's End, a science fiction novel set in 2007, planned as the first book, of five, in the Noumena series, was published by St. Martin's Press on July 21, 2020, and entered The New York Times Best Seller list at number 7 on August 9, as well as appearing on the Los Angeles Times and Wall Street Journal bestseller lists. Ellis was subsequently shortlisted for the Astounding Award for Best New Writer, which is given out during the Hugo Award ceremonies. In July 2022, Ellis made a guest appearance on MusicalSplaining. She also appeared in the final episode of the podcast in December 2023.

== Personal life ==
Ellis is bisexual and a vegetarian. Ellis and her husband live in Long Beach, California. They have two children.

== Bibliography ==
- Noumena series:
  - Axiom's End (2020)
  - Truth of the Divine (2021)
  - Apostles of Mercy (2024)
- Degenerates (tbd)

== Awards and nominations ==
| Year | Award | Category | Nominated works | Result |
|---|---|---|---|---|
| 2011 | USA Film Festival Short Film | Non-Fiction Award | The A Word | Won |
| 2011 | USA Film Festival Short Film | Student Award | The A Word | Won |
| 2012 | IDA Documentary Award | David L. Wolper Student Documentary Award | The A Word | Nominated |
| 2019 | Hugo Award | Best Related Work | The Hobbit Duology | Nominated |
| 2021 | 11th Streamy Awards | Commentary | Self | Nominated |
| 2021 | Astounding Award | Best New Writer | Axiom's End | Nominated |

== See also ==
- BreadTube – Group of left-wing YouTubers
- ContraPoints – American YouTuber (born 1988)
- List of LGBTQ YouTubers
