= Axiom's End =

2020 science fiction novel by Lindsay Ellis

- Author: Lindsay Ellis
- Audio read by: Abigail Thorn; Stephanie Willis
- Language: English
- Series: Noumena
- Genre: Science fiction
- Published: July 21, 2020
- Publisher: St. Martin's Press
- Publication place: United States
- Media type: Print (hardcover)
- Pages: 384
- ISBN: 978-1250256737
- Followed by: Truth of the Divine

Axiom's End is a 2020 science fiction alternate history novel by American writer Lindsay Ellis. Set in 2007, the novel is about a U.S. government coverup of contact with extraterrestrial life. Axiom's End entered The New York Times Best Seller list at number 7. It is Ellis's debut novel.

== Plot ==
In an alternate version of the United States in 2007, famous whistleblower Nils Ortega leverages his large online following to repeatedly attack the Bush administration, alleging a series of government cover-ups. The nature of Nils's work forced him to flee the country, abandoning his family. Nils's daughter, Cora Sabino, lives with her mother and her two younger siblings in Southern California, where her aunt Luciana, a former federal agent, also resides. Cora's family find themselves under constant supervision by agents of the U.S. government, including a CIA official named Sol Kaplan.

Following a meteor strike nearby, Cora's family is abducted by government agents while Cora flees from an alien creature that broke into their house at night. The alien catches Cora, implanting a tracking and communication device into her, using her as a human puppet to launch an infiltration of the Googleplex for unknown reasons. This infiltration fails when a mysterious pulse of energy knocks out the alien. It is revealed that the alien came to Earth to figure out how another member of his species died while being held in captivity by the government. Cora and the alien strike a wary alliance, as Cora wants to reunite with her abducted family members while the alien needs a human interpreter. Cora names the alien Ampersand, after the government's leaked codename for the meteor. Cora contacts Luciana in an attempt to convey Ampersand to his fellow aliens, called "amygdalines," who are being held in the Cheyenne Mountain Complex. Ampersand bonds with Cora as she attempts to create translations between the amygdaline language and English. Ampersand reveals to Cora that the majority of amygdaline "Oligarchs" voted to commit planetary genocide against an alien race, against the wishes of Ampersand and a few other Oligarchs. It was determined that the dissenting Oligarchs, including Ampersand, were genetically defective, causing their flight to Earth with "the Genome," a mysterious package of genetic information. Ampersand notes that the amygdaline race will likely attempt genocide against humanity as well.

Nils and his followers continue to attack the government, embroiling George W. Bush in a scandal around an alleged attempt to cover up first contact with an alien species. Amidst a public outcry, Bush resigns, and Dick Cheney is sworn in as president. Cora and Ampersand argue over cultural differences between humans and amygdalines, and Cora storms off. Meanwhile, a hostile amygdaline, Obelus, arrives at Cheyenne Mountain and attacks the facility. Cora escapes with the Genome, but Ampersand and the other amygdalines are lost. In transit, the Genome hatches from its egg, revealing itself to be a fragile, newborn amygdaline. After surviving a car crash and severe injuries, Cora leaves the Genome with Luciana and attempts to track down Ampersand. Upon meeting with Cora, Ampersand heals her wounds, makes amends, then urges her to leave him for her own safety. She begins to do so, but doubles back when she realizes that Obelus has found Ampersand and is attempting to negotiate. Eavesdropping on their conversation, Cora discovers that Ampersand and Obelus are pair-bonded. Obelus abducts Cora and the other amygdalines as insurance in exchange for Ampersand bringing Obelus the Genome. Amidst an altercation between Cora and Obelus's guards, she is badly injured. Upon waking up, she realizes that Ampersand has arrived with the Genome, but is refusing to turn it over. The Genome is wounded by Obelus and dies. Suspicious that Obelus is genetically defective, and prompted by a tip from Cora, Obelus's guards attack and kill Obelus. Ampersand escapes carrying the still-wounded Cora.

Cora awakes in a hospital, attended to by her mother and siblings, who have been released from government custody after Nils publicizes their abduction. That night, Ampersand appears in Cora's hospital room and, at her request, curls up next to her. Ampersand reveals that, in a moment of desperation, he pair-bonded with Cora in order to track her when she was under Obelus's arrest. Strongly affected by the revelation that they have pair-bonded, Cora asks Ampersand not to leave her. Though he agrees, he notes that, given their disparate constitutions, they will never truly know each other.

== Release ==
The book was released as an audiobook by Macmillan Audio, with narration by Abigail Thorn and Stephanie Willis. It was nominated for an Audie Award for Science Fiction in 2021.

== Reception ==
Reviewers praised Axiom's End's fast pace and cultural commentary. Pajiba said it is "less about action than an exploration of communication across boundaries both human and deeply inhuman," and praised Ellis's handling of the book's themes, and that her "well-trained eye for the oddities and political edges of various cultural contexts comes in very handy." Ryan Britt of Syfy Wire said that Ellis's authorial voice serves to "demystify" the story's central concepts: "Luckily, unlike so many 'big idea' sci-fi books, it's utterly unpretentious." John Hickman of Like the Dew noted that the novel moves readers from a pessimistic to an optimistic astrobiology assessment of First Contact. Kirkus Reviews said the book "uses first contact to interrogate our tendencies toward xenophobia and prejudice and challenge our conceptions of what humanity means" and that it is "solid" but unpolished. Other critiques focused on the novel's conclusion, which balances tying up the story's events while setting up a sequel.

== Sequels ==
In a video uploaded to YouTube on July 19, 2020, Ellis announced that the second and third books in the Axiom's End series would be released in summer 2021 and 2022. The second novel, Truth of the Divine, was published in October 2021. Apostles of Mercy, the third book out of a planned five, was published on June 4, 2024.
