= Abigail Thorn =

English YouTuber and actress (born 1993)

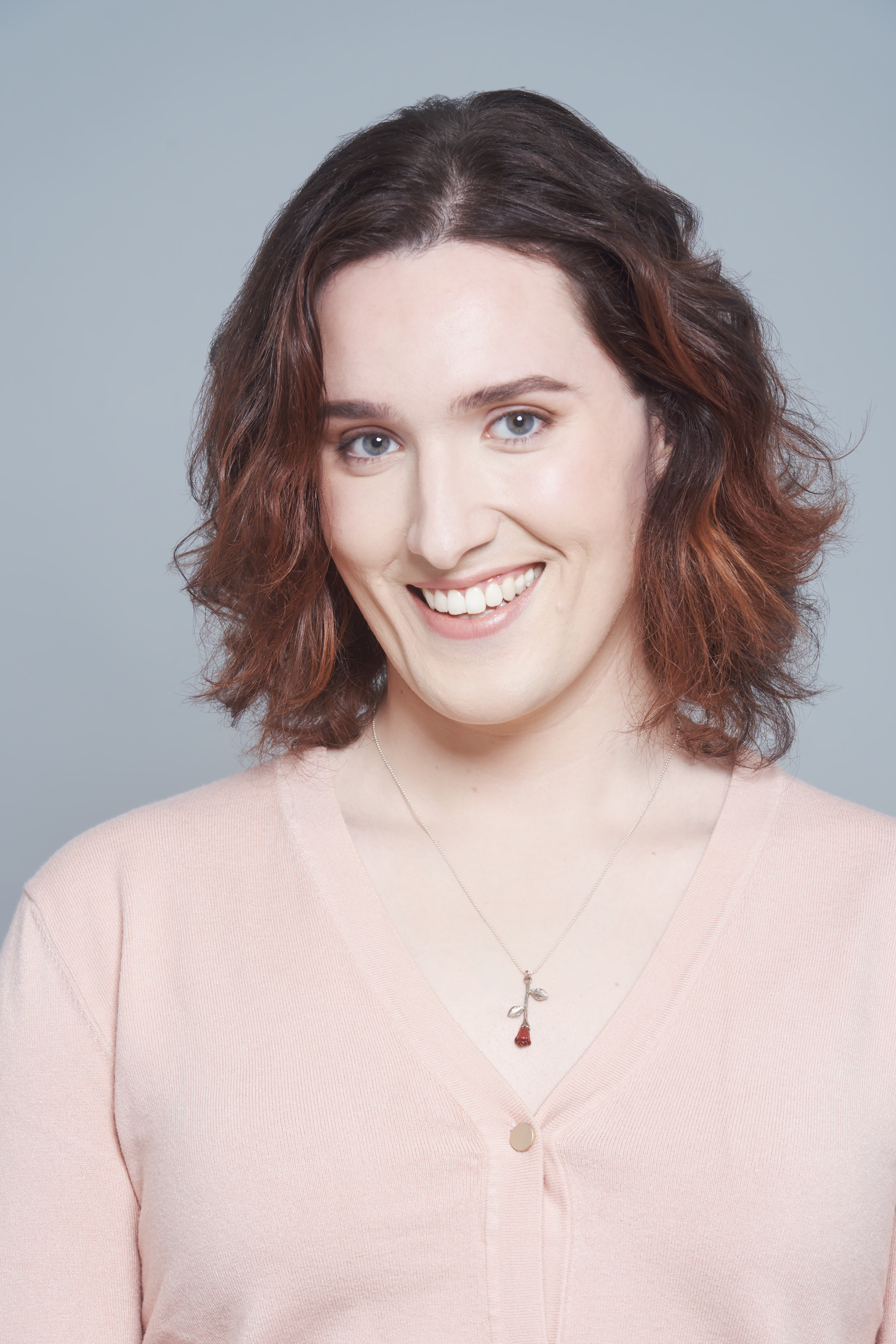
- Thorn in 2021
- Born: 24 April 1993 (age 33); Newcastle upon Tyne, England
- Education: Royal Grammar School; University of St Andrews (MA); East 15 Acting School (MA)
- Occupations: Actress; playwright; YouTuber

YouTube information
- Channel: Philosophy Tube
- Years active: 2013–present
- Subscribers: 1.67 million
- Views: 131.64 million
- Last updated: 19 June 2026

Abigail Thorn (born 24 April 1993) is an English YouTuber, actress, and playwright. Thorn created the YouTube channel Philosophy Tube in 2013, when she sought to provide free lessons in philosophy in the wake of the 2012 increase in university tuition fees in England. In 2018, her videos became more theatrical, beginning to incorporate dramatic studio sets, lighting, costuming and makeup. The channel has been positively received by critics and has over one million subscribers.

In 2019, Thorn hosted a livestream on Twitch in which she read plays from the Complete Works of Shakespeare for the mental health charity Samaritans. The stream lasted five days, featured a number of guests, and raised over £100,000 for the charity. In September and October 2022, The Prince—a play written by and starring Thorn—ran Off West End. The transgender-themed work is based on characters in Shakespeare's Henry IV, Part 1 becoming self-aware.

Thorn publicly came out as a transgender woman in January 2021, with the video Coming Out As Trans – A Little Public Statement and the more theatrical Identity: A Trans Coming Out Story.

== Early and personal life ==
Thorn was born on 24 April 1993. She is from Newcastle upon Tyne and has two older brothers. She attended the Royal Grammar School, where she was a member of an army cadets group. Thorn credits her discovery of philosophy to her teacher, as well as having taken the subject as an A-level course. She later studied Philosophy and Theology at the University of St. Andrews, where she also participated in Mermaids and the St Andrews Revue. Thorn graduated with a Scottish Master of Arts in Philosophy in 2015, coming top of her year. She then trained at East 15 Acting School, completing a Master of Arts awarded by the University of Essex in 2017 before moving to London.

In October 2019, Thorn discussed her sexuality in her YouTube video Queer, where she came out as bisexual. On 30 January 2021, Thorn came out as a trans woman. She has spoken at protests in favour of transgender health care and said that transgender liberation is a more important goal than transgender representation among fictional characters or celebrities. Thorn cited the trans singer Kim Petras and the feminist Audre Lorde as influences in understanding her femininity. In a 2022 interview, Thorn described herself as a trans lesbian.

== Career ==
=== YouTube ===
Thorn began her YouTube channel, Philosophy Tube, as an educational channel in 2013 in response to the university tuition fees in the United Kingdom tripling in 2012, rendering higher education less accessible. Thorn made it her mission statement to "[give] away a philosophy degree for free". Thorn originally planned to record her lectures and upload them, rather than appearing in videos, but her university would not allow this. Her first video titled "I think therefore I am" about René Descartes was uploaded in May 2013. Her first subscriber unsubscribed in protest when she first voiced feminist opinions. Prior to transition, she presented the channel under the name Oliver Thorn.

Thorn makes money from both YouTube advertisement revenue and crowdfunding on Patreon. The channel's style progressed over a period of years from a direct style of talking to the camera about the works of philosophers such as René Descartes and Immanuel Kant, to more theatrical productions. In 2016, Thorn took part in the YouTube NextUp, a week-long training programme for YouTubers with under 100,000 subscribers.

In 2018, Thorn decided to change her content creation, beginning to film at a studio with costumes and makeup. She was inspired by the 2018 conference VidCon, the channel ContraPoints, and the ending of an abusive relationship. She also used props such as snakes and horses. Characters and music began to feature.

Joel Burrows of The Latch said that these videos were characterised by their narratives, set design and monologues. Kayleigh Donaldson of Pajiba described the works as "long-form think-pieces" with "detailed production design" that use aspects of sketch comedy. Emily St. James of Vox summarised that the channel covers both philosophical topics and "sociopolitical ideas of the current era from a leftist point of view". For instance, a video about the former Trump advisor and Breitbart News co-founder Steve Bannon features Thorn performing a cover of a Hadestown song, with lyrics about Bannon. Food, Beauty, Mind features Kelly Slaughter, an exploitative technology company CEO.

In January 2020, Dmitry Kuznetsov and Milan Ismangil, writing for tripleC, reported that the channel is a focus of an internet fan community centred around leftist YouTubers categorised as "BreadTube". The authors note fan crowdfunding, production value, criticism of the alt-right, use of citation and videos about broad topics as common BreadTube attributes that are employed by Philosophy Tube. As a case study, Thorn's Climate Grief discusses climate change through multiple personas, citing Timothy Morton's concept of hyperobjects and Terry Eagleton's Why Marx Was Right. In the video, Thorn criticises some right-wing and left-wing arguments and highlights indigenous philosophy.

In 2021, Thorn reached one million subscribers. In an interview with Insider, Thorn said she had an idea for the final Philosophy Tube episode and that the channel's continuation depended on future acting roles. She saw it as successful due to her subscriber numbers, an invitation to be a featured creator at 2021 VidCon and other YouTube channels that were inspired by her.

Thorn's 2018 video Suic!de and Ment@l He@lth [sic] examines societal attitudes to mental health, along with her personal experiences: she has a history of self-harm and attempted suicide twice in her life. She said in mid-2019 that she still received at least one email per day by a person who said the video saved their life. Thorn's video Men. Abuse. Trauma. is about men and mental health, with reference to her personal experiences. The video is 35 minutes long, with the script entirely memorised by Thorn. There are no cuts or editing, and a single costume change is facilitated by a slow camera pan across the room; Thorn used the second of two takes. Both the script and the style of the video reference the 1944 Jean-Paul Sartre play No Exit. Emily St. James of Vox praised that the "tension and vulnerability that builds" is maintained by the lack of editing, and opined that in the video, "aesthetic form is inseparable from content".

=== Coming Out As Trans and Identity ===
Coming Out As Trans – A Little Public Statement video, originally posted to YouTube on 30 January 2021

On 30 January 2021, Thorn came out as a trans woman via a public statement, posted on social media and recorded as the video Coming Out As Trans – A Little Public Statement. Jezebel's Harron Walker described it as a "feminist, anticapitalist appeal in support [of] trans people's legal equality, physical autonomy, and broader liberation in the United Kingdom and beyond". The statement discussed issues in access to healthcare, journalist fearmongering about transgender people and a lack of elected transgender representatives. She also says that other issues in society like homelessness disproportionately affect the trans community. "Abigail" trended on Twitter subsequent to the announcement.

Thorn also released Identity: A Trans Coming Out Story, which drew on the work of the American writer Audre Lorde and saw Rhys Tees acting in the role of Thorn's former self. Thorn told the Daily Xtra that studying works by trans philosophers helped her gain insight about her identity, but that she felt significant societal pressure as a transgender public figure. Prior to the announcement, she had come out to friends and family but experienced difficulties in avoiding being publicly outed in day-to-day life, and in accessing trans spaces anonymously. Her messages to other trans public figures went unanswered and she fell out of contact with a trans friend who told her that being transgender was "a curse". Thorn had chosen to act as a man in some of her videos despite having realised she was transgender, and decided to keep her pre-transition videos public because of their educational content and artistic value, and as she did not think being transgender should be a source of shame.

In a 2021 interview with Ben Hunte for the BBC, Thorn described anxiety over publicising her transition, but felt that she could not have kept it private for much longer. Thorn told Insider that prior to her transition, when male fans would refer to her as a positive role model for masculinity, "it always felt like they were talking about someone else". She described: "I tried to do the man of the 21st century thing ... woke but also compassionate and fun and charming and sexy and all the rest of it ... and it all made me sort of miserable really. But I understand why some of my audience felt that way". When she came out, she felt external pressure to "perform a certain model of femininity", as a "white, stylish, eloquent, charming, non-threatening woman", saying that "that's kind of what British women are expected to be".

=== Charity livestream ===
In 2019, Thorn aimed to read the Complete Works of Shakespeare in order to raise money for the Samaritans, a UK charity that helps people in emotional distress. Thorn chose the charity because she said that its telephone hotline "saved [her] life when [she] was considering suicide". She chose Shakespeare based on the idea that "Shakespeare features every human emotion", which she attributed to Judi Dench. The stream was inspired by a January 2019 video game stream by hbomberguy which raised £278,000 ($340,000) for British transgender charity Mermaids. It was announced at the end of her YouTube video Men. Abuse. Trauma., which was released in late July 2019.

Streaming on Twitch, Thorn began on Friday 23 August and finished on Tuesday 27 August, streaming continuously with only a few hours per day for sleep. Many internet personalities joined Thorn to voice roles in the plays, such as Mara Wilson as Lady Macbeth and Dominique "SonicFox" McLean as Troilus and Cressida's Hector. Thorn initially expected to raise between $2,000 and $5,000, but said on Twitter that the stream had raised £109,447.54 (roughly $130,000) after PayPal currency conversion fees. Over 175,000 people watched the stream. The Royal Shakespeare Company praised Thorn for the endeavour, as did the Samaritans.

=== Acting ===
In the second and third series of Ladhood, which were released on BBC iPlayer in 2021 and 2022, Thorn played the role of Iona, appearing in four episodes. In May 2021, it was announced that Thorn would appear in a 10-episode television series, Django, a remake of the 1966 Western film. The series was released in 2023.

Thorn voiced Nocturne, a secondary character in the video game Baldur's Gate 3. The role included motion capture. Sarah Guinevere Smit of Rock Paper Shotgun lauded Nocturne's transgender identity, characterisation and diary entries. The Mary Sue's Madeline Carpou described the character as "an incredibly sweet, lovely presence".

She played Ensign Eurus in the Star Wars television series The Acolyte released in June 2024, and Sharako Lohar in a House of the Dragon episode released in August 2024.

In November 2023, it was announced that Thorn had written Dracula's Ex-Girlfriend, a short film about a dinner between two of Dracula's former partners. It follows a theatrical adaptation of Dracula that was abandoned due to COVID-19 lockdowns, which would have interpreted Count Dracula as a powerful, abusive man who manipulated people's insecurities. Thorn starred alongside Morgana Ignis and Brandon Rogers. The film began production in February 2024 and was released on Nebula on September 13, 2024.

==== The Prince ====
Thorn wrote and was the acting lead in the Off West End play, The Prince, at the Southwark Playhouse. The show features characters becoming self-aware and trying to escape from Shakespeare's oeuvre, centring around Henry IV, Part 1 and Hamlet. It was funded by Nebula and a filmed performance was released on the platform in February 2023. The eight-person cast was majority-trans. Previews began on 15 September 2022 and the performance run was from 19 September 2022 to 8 October 2022.

The Prince has themes of transgender identity, political radicalisation and unhealthy romantic, platonic and familial relationships. Thorn described it as "Like The Matrix if it was written in 1600". The programme notes compare it to the play Rosencrantz and Guildenstern are Dead, which shows Hamlet from the perspective of two minor characters. Thorn said that Shakespeare is fit for trans allegory as performers were originally all male and the writing is dense with jokes about people dressing up as or being confused for other genders. Thorn's character, Hotspur, is written by Shakespeare as having idealised manhood. Thorn did not see it as a "queer play", but more generally one about "characters who are trapped for all sorts of reasons". She compared it to a period of concealing her gender on Philosophy Tube.

The play received three stars out of five in reviews from The Guardian, The Daily Telegraph, BroadwayWorld, The Stage and The Reviews Hub. A reviewer for The Guardian, Kate Wyver, said that it is an "ambitious if slightly feverish exploration of transgression and transition within Shakespeare's plays" that "playfully questions the performance of gender and the roles we are all assigned". Claire Allfree of The Daily Telegraph analysed that The Prince fit well with Shakespeare's use of metatheatre and themes of gender and performance. However, BroadwayWorld's Cindy Marcolina believed that "the scripted ending stands on wobbly feet and the framing never gets the explanation it needs to be satisfyingly convincing". Critics for The Stage and The Reviews Hub praised the transgender themes but criticised aspects of the writing.

=== Other activities ===
In February 2021, Thorn joined November Kelly and Devon in hosting the podcast Kill James Bond!, a film review podcast which initially focused on the James Bond films. The podcast takes a critical angle, attempting in the words of its creators to "give 007 the socialist, feminist upcoming he so richly deserves". It peaked at #1 on Chartable's list of most popular film review podcast in the UK. Thorn said that she got involved after Kelly suggested the podcast on Twitter. She was familiar with the Bond films from her childhood and believed that they are flawed "in interesting ways that say interesting things about Britain". She saw Bond as symbolic of a "British sort of military masculinity" and commented that both she and Kelly had been army cadets as children. The podcast has also reviewed the film series Bourne, Jack Ryan, OSS 117, and The Man from U.N.C.L.E.

Thorn narrated the audiobook for Axiom's End (2020) by Lindsay Ellis, alongside Stephanie Willis. For her narration she was jointly nominated for an Audie Award for Science Fiction.

== Reception ==
Shannon Strucci, writing for the magazine Sight & Sound published by the British Film Institute, said that Thorn's videos "vary tremendously" in "tone and content". Strucci described the videos as "always well-researched, inventive, and theatrical". The German broadcaster Deutsche Welle praised the videos as entertaining and elaborate in design. The channel Philosophy Tube was recommended in the Slovak broadsheet SME. The Irish author and broadcaster Emma Dabiri has enjoyed Thorn's videos. In 2021, Philosophy Tube was recommended in a list of open access streaming content in an essay for Choice Reviews, and two reviewers for The Guardian—Frances Ryan and Ammar Kalia—praised the channel.

Emily St. James described the video Men. Abuse. Trauma. as "one of the best TV episodes of the year". Dan Schindel of Hyperallergic described the same video as a "riveting half-hour", praising its lack of cuts. The video was also praised by Lukáš Pokorný in the Czech magazine A2. Thorn's video Queer was one of 134 video essays included in Sight and Sound as one of the "best video essays of 2019". Strucci reviewed for the magazine that the video was "illuminating and entertaining" as well as "joyful". Gwendolyn Ann Smith, writing for the Bay Area Reporter, praised Identity: A Trans Coming Out Story as "delving deeply into the very nature of being trans in ways [she has] not typically seen", in relation to the perspective that gender transitioning is about "revealing the truth within" rather than "becoming something that we weren't".

Schindel recommended the video Artists & Fandoms. St. James praised that, in Steve Bannon, Thorn "undercuts [Bannon's] entire shtick". Merryana Salem, writing for Junkee, said The Trouble with the Video Game Industry was one of her "all-time favourite Youtube videos". Salem later recommended Data—a video about ethical concerns of data mining—as one of "10 Video Essays That Will Get You Addicted To Video Essays". Wil Williams of Polygon reviewed Data as one of Thorn's most underrated videos, comparing the format to a Platonic dialogue and the interactive film Black Mirror: Bandersnatch.

=== Awards and nominations ===
In 2022, Thorn was awarded an Off West End Theatre Award ("Offie") in the "OneOff" category. The awarding body credited her as "a pioneer for trans rights" across her YouTube work, Shakespeare charity livestream, and role in The Prince. Thorn was listed among Diva's Power List of 100 influential LGBT individuals in 2022, 2023 and 2024.

Thorn was nominated in the category Online Influencer for a 2021 British LGBT Award. Thorn declined the nomination citing moral and political disagreements with the award's sponsors.

Awards and nominations received by Abigail Thorn
| Year | Award | Category | Work | Result | Ref. |
|---|---|---|---|---|---|
| 2021 | Audie Awards | Audie Award for Science Fiction | Axiom's End | Nominated | |
| 2021 | British LGBT Awards | Online Influencer | —N/a | Declined nomination | |
| 2022 | Off West End Theatre Awards | Special Award | —N/a | Won | |
| 2022 | BroadwayWorld UK / West End Awards | Best Leading Performer in a New Production of a Play | The Prince | Won | |
| 2022 | BroadwayWorld UK / West End Awards | Best New Production of a Play | The Prince | Won | |

== Acting credits ==
=== Audio drama ===
| Year | Title | Role | Notes |
|---|---|---|---|
| 2024 | Faithless: A Sojourn Story | Aranai Lirune | |

=== Television ===
| Year | Title | Role | Notes | Ref. |
|---|---|---|---|---|
| 2021–2022 | Ladhood | Iona | 4 episodes | |
| 2023 | Django | Jess | 6 episodes | |
| 2024 | The Acolyte | Ensign Eurus | 2 episodes | |
| 2024–2026 | House of the Dragon | Sharako Lohar | Episodes: "The Queen Who Ever Was" and "Salt and Sea, Fire and Blood" | |

=== Film ===
| Year | Title | Role | Notes | Ref. |
|---|---|---|---|---|
| 2023 | The Prince | Hotspur | Filmed performance of stage play | |
| 2024 | Dracula's Ex-Girlfriend | Belladona | Short | |
| 2024 | IDENTITEAZE | Val | Short film | |
| 2026 | Again Again | Naomi | | |

=== Video games ===
| Year | Title | Role | Notes | Ref. |
|---|---|---|---|---|
| 2023 | Harmony: The Fall of Reverie | Nora | —N/a | |
| 2023 | Baldur's Gate III | Nocturne | —N/a | |

=== Stage ===
| Year | Title | Role | Notes |
|---|---|---|---|
| 2022 | The Prince | Hotspur | Also written by |
| 2026 | Blink | Sophie | |

=== Web ===
| Year | Title | Role | Notes |
|---|---|---|---|
| 2026 | Yu-Gi-Oh!: The Abridged Series | KaibaCorp Train Conductor | |
