= Kat Blaque =

American YouTuber and activist

- Born: Lynwood, California, U.S.
- Education: California Institute of the Arts (BFA)
- Occupations: Illustrator; writer; YouTube personality; vlogger

YouTube information
- Channel: Kat Blaque
- Years active: 2005–present
- Genres: Commentary; lifestyle; vlogging
- Subscribers: 637 thousand
- Views: 66.5 million
- Last updated: June 19, 2026

Kathryn Wilkins, better known as Kat Blaque, is an American YouTuber, visual artist and LGBT rights activist known for her content discussing feminism, LGBTQ identity, American politics, dating, pop culture and art.

== Early life ==
Blaque was born in Lynwood, California and raised in Walnut, California. She is adopted. In middle school, Blaque began to question her gender identity and started to identify as genderqueer. She began identifying as a trans woman in college. Blaque graduated from the California Institute of the Arts in 2012 with a BFA in character animation.

== Career ==
=== YouTube ===
Blaque started video blogging in 2005. In December 2010 she started her current main YouTube channel, Kat Blaque which is focused on discussing race, gender, and other social justice issues. Blaque has described herself by saying, "I'm a woman, I'm black, I'm curvy and I'm trans. There are a lot of things that I deal with. When I talk about those things, I am literally talking about my embodiment of these intersections."

In 2017, Blaque started a weekly YouTube series called True Tea where she answers questions that viewers send her about racism, transphobia, black culture and several other topics. Blaque has made guest appearances on several other YouTuber's videos such as the BuzzFeed video about gender pronouns. She has also collaborated with YouTubers such as Franchesca "Chescaleigh" Ramsey and Ari Fitz. The Advocate reports that "Her YouTube videos are shown as educational tools in classrooms".

=== Illustration ===
In 2015, Blaque also teamed up with fellow artist and YouTuber Franchesca Ramsey to animate Ramsey's story "Sometimes You're A Caterpillar". This short film addresses privilege and has since been shared on several sites, including Everyday Feminism, Upworthy, Mic, and MTV.

=== Other ventures ===
Blaque has contributed to websites such as Everyday Feminism and the Huffington Post's Black Voices section. Blaque participated in a panel on writing transgender characters at the 2015 San Diego Comic-Con and was the keynote speaker at the University of Toledo's LGBTQA History month celebration.
