= Palestine Children's Relief Fund =

American non-profit organization

- Abbreviation: PCRF
- Formation: 1991; 35 years ago
- Type: Nonprofit organization (IRS exemption status): 501(c)(3)
- Region served: Middle East
- Key people: Steve Sosebee (founder); Vivian Rasem Khalaf (chairwoman); Lubna Musa (CEO)
- Website: www.pcrf.net

The Palestine Children's Relief Fund (PCRF) is a registered 501(c)(3) non-governmental organization established in 1991, by, according to its website, "concerned people in the U.S. to address the medical and humanitarian crisis facing Palestinian youths in the Middle East." The main objective of the PCRF is to locate in the United States and Europe free medical care for children who cannot be adequately treated in the Middle East. Since 1991, tens of thousands of young people have received medical treatment through the PCRF.

The PCRF was founded by Steve Sosebee, who served as the organization's President for 30 years.

== Humanitarian activities ==
The Palestine Children's Relief Fund sends medical equipment, supplies, and American medical personnel to the region to treat difficult cases and train Palestinian surgeons. Several injured or sick children are being treated in the U.S. for free. The PCRF relies on volunteers throughout the U.S. who act as host families and donors. The organization also helps suffering children from other Middle Eastern nations, based on medical need. The PCRF has built two pediatric cancer departments in the West Bank and the Gaza Strip. In addition to physical medical care, the PCRF operates a mental health program in Gaza.

== History ==
=== 1991: Establishment ===
The Palestine Children's Relief Fund was established in 1991. It was founded by Steve Sosebee, a former journalist who, while on assignment in Hebron, brought Palestinian children in need to Akron, Ohio, to receive free medical care. Sosebee later met Huda al Masry, a Palestinian social worker with the YMCA in Jerusalem. Sosebee and al Masry married in 1993, and had two daughters.

=== 2004–2007: Attempted donation by the Holy Land Foundation, and Open Heart ===
In 2004, the Holy Land Foundation—a group which was shut down by the United States government because it was suspected of funneling donations to terrorist organizations—attempted to make a donation of $50,000 ($85,227 in 2025) to the PCRF. Steve Sosebee, president of the PCRF, said at the time that if the PCRF received the donation, the money would be used to fund its relief services. That same year, NBC televised the fictional film Homeland Security featuring a scene in which the PCRF is referred to as a terrorist organization and "a front for Islamic Jihad". As a result, Sosebee received numerous phone calls and e-mails asking about how the PCRF uses its funds.

In 2006, the PCRF, in cooperation with the British Arts Council, produced the 22-minute documentary film Open Heart. Directed by Claire Fowler, the film is about a nine-month-old boy named Jamal with congenital heart disease, and the efforts by his family, a British surgeon, and the PCRF to provide him treatment.

=== 2009–2020: Pediatric cancer units ===
In 2009, al Masry died of cancer, and Sosebee moved to Palestine with his daughters. There, the PCRF built the first public pediatric cancer department in Bethlehem, and named it after al Masry. In 2016, Sosebee married pediatric oncologist Dr. Zeena Salman. In February 2019, the PCRF built a second cancer department, this time in the Gaza Strip.

=== 2021–present: Ongoing work ===
During the 2021 Israel–Palestine crisis, online streamers and other online content creators on platforms such as Twitch and YouTube held fundraisers in support of the PCRF, most notably Vaush, who raised $292,284.71. On 17 May 2021, Israeli airstrikes damaged PCRF offices in Gaza City. In November 2023, the al-Rantisi hospital in Gaza City, which is run by the PCRF, was struck by an Israeli airstrike, killing eight people and damaging the building.

On November 16, 2023, PCRF awarded America Near East Refugee Aid, in partnership with World Central Kitchen, a $1.5 million grant to provide hot meals for distribution to displaced individuals during the Gaza war.

Founder Steve Sosebee departed the organization on December 31, 2023, after serving 30 years, to pursue other humanitarian efforts in Palestine.

== Reception ==
As of November 2023, PCRF has held a four-star charity rating since September 2012 from Charity Navigator, an independent evaluator of charities' fiscal management. The organization has received support and endorsements from U.S. senator Paul Sarbanes, former U.S. congressman Albert Wynn, and actor and humanitarian Richard Gere.

In October 2006, former U.S. president Jimmy Carter issued a video endorsement of the organization.

== See also ==
- Islamic Medical Association of North America
