= ContraPoints =

American YouTuber (born 1988)

Natalie Wynn
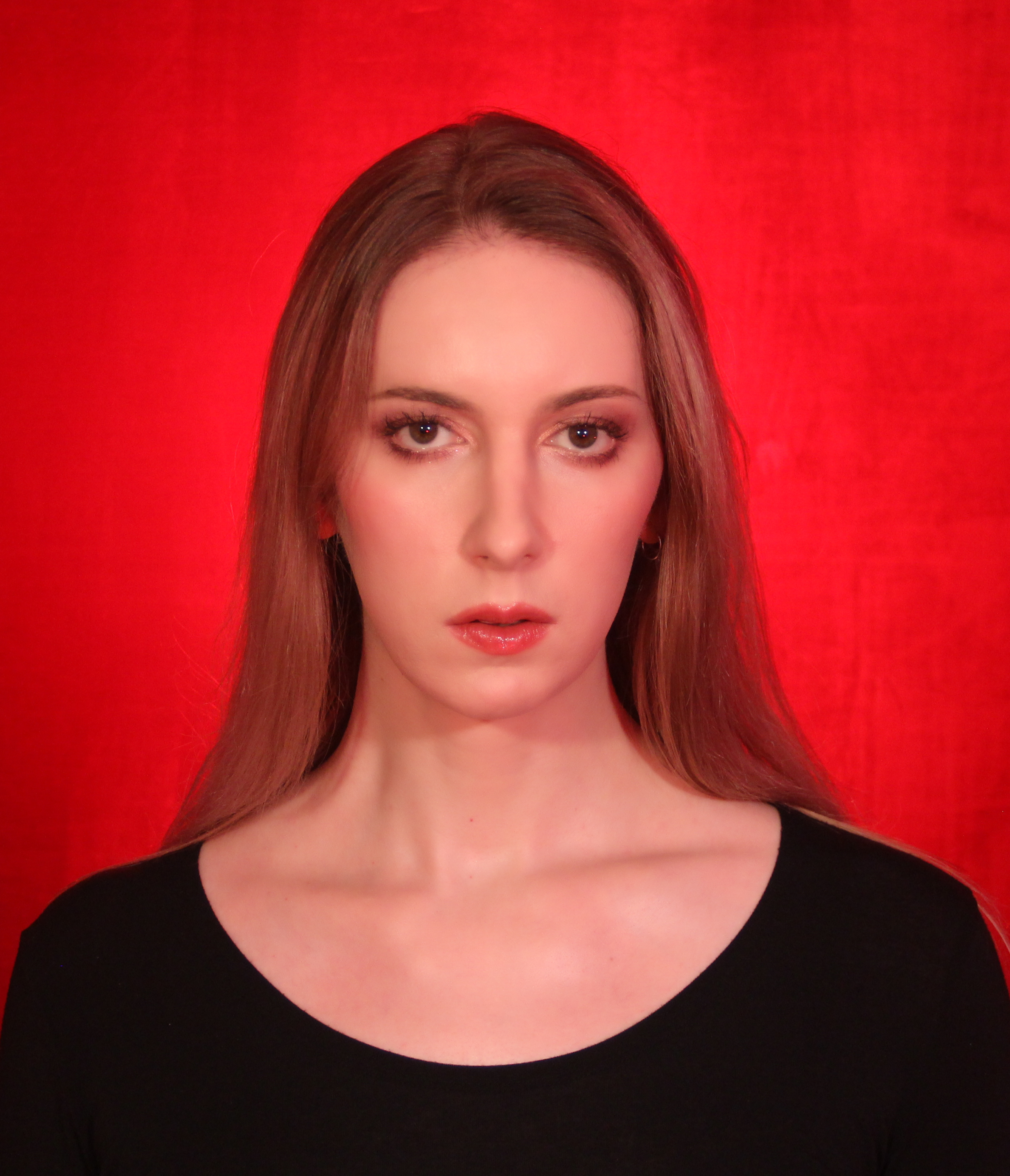
- Wynn in 2020
- Born: October 21, 1988 (age 38); Arlington, Virginia, U.S.
- Education: Berklee College of Music; Georgetown University (BA); Northwestern University (MA)
- Occupations: YouTuber; livestreamer

YouTube information
- Channels: ContraPoints; ContraPointsLive
- Years active: 2008–present
- Subscribers: 1.91 million (main channel); 141 thousand (live channel)
- Views: 119.2 million (main channel); 6.9 million (live channel)
- Last updated: June 14, 2026
- Website: www.contrapoints.com

Natalie Wynn (born October 21, 1988) is an American left-wing YouTuber, political commentator, and cultural critic. She is best known for her YouTube channel, ContraPoints, where she creates video essays exploring topics such as politics, gender, ethics, race, and philosophy.

Her videos often provide counterarguments to right-wing extremists and classical liberals. They comment on modern social issues such as class inequality, transgender rights (as well as LGBTQ rights more broadly), cancel culture, and modern internet culture. Her videos make use of set design, costumes, and characters.

Wynn won a Streamy Award for "Commentary" in 2020 and was nominated in the same category at the 2021 Streamy Awards. In 2022, she became an honoree of a Peabody Award.

== Early life ==
Wynn was born on October 21, 1988, in Arlington, Virginia, and raised in Vienna, Virginia. Her father is a psychology professor, and her mother is a doctor.

After studying piano at Berklee College of Music, Wynn attended Georgetown University, where she studied philosophy. She then enrolled at Northwestern University to pursue a PhD in philosophy, where she also served as an instructor. She left Northwestern with a master's degree. She moved to Baltimore, Maryland, for a relationship, which ended up failing. After quitting her PhD program, Wynn taught piano and worked as a paralegal, Uber driver, and copywriter. She eventually decided to begin making video responses to the alt-right and Gamergate on YouTube.

== YouTube career ==
Wynn started publishing YouTube videos in 2008, initially focusing on criticism of religion and her position as an atheist and a skeptic. In 2016, she began the ContraPoints channel in reaction to the Gamergate controversy and the increasing prevalence of right-wing YouTubers, shifting her content to countering their arguments. Early ContraPoints videos also covered subjects such as race, racism, and online radicalization.

In her videos, Wynn utilizes philosophy and personal anecdotes not only to explain left-wing ideas but also to criticize typical conservative, classical liberal, alt-right, and fascist talking points. Wynn's videos often have a combative but humorous tone, containing dark and surreal humor, sarcasm, and sexual themes. She usually illustrates concepts by playing different characters who debate one another. The videos have been noted for her production choices, such as dramatic lighting and elaborate costumes. She borrows some aesthetic cues from drag performance.

In a 2018 interview for The Verge, journalist Katherine Cross notes a difference between Wynn in person and how she presents herself on YouTube. Cross explains that the channel projects a "blithe, aloof, decadent and disdainful" image, whereas Wynn, personally, "can be earnest—and she cares deeply, almost too much," with Wynn concurring: "Contra has BDE. I do not." The video channel is financed through the crowdfunding platform Patreon, which has about 59,000 supporters, 23,000 of which are paying supporters, as of June 2026.

Wynn provided voice acting for the 2022 Netflix show Bee and PuppyCat.

== Political views ==
Wynn is a feminist who, circa 2019, referred to herself as a democratic socialist. However, in a 2026 interview with Briahna Joy Gray, Wynn moved to referring to herself a left liberal and described herself as a social democrat aligned with the left wing of the Democratic Party, such as Alexandria Ocasio-Cortez. She campaigned for Barack Obama in 2012 and initially supported Hillary Clinton in the 2016 Democratic presidential primary, believing her to be more electorally viable than Bernie Sanders. Clinton's defeat, combined with Donald Trump's victory, prompted her to reconsider what was politically possible and become more open to progressive politics. She endorsed Bernie Sanders in the 2020 Democratic presidential primaries and supports Ocasio-Cortez.

== Reception ==
Writing for Vice, Jake Hall called Wynn "one of the most incisive and compelling video essayists on YouTube." New York magazine states, "ContraPoints is very good. Regardless of the viewer's interest or lack thereof in internet culture wars, YouTube Nazis, or any of the other wide-ranging subjects covered in its videos, they're funny, bizarre, erudite, and compelling." Nathan J. Robinson of Current Affairs calls ContraPoints a "one-woman blitzkrieg against the YouTube right." Media often describe the channel's content as suited to a millennial audience due to its style and attention to online culture.

The Southern Poverty Law Center has cited her analysis of right-wing use of memes and coded symbols in an article explaining the right-wing use of the OK sign. In The Nation, journalist Liza Featherstone recommends the channel, saying that Wynn does a "fabulous job" acknowledging her opponents' valid points while debunking weak arguments and revealing the influence of a sometimes unacknowledged far-right political agenda.

In November 2018, after a ContraPoints video about incels reached over one million views, The New Yorker carried a report on the channel, describing Wynn as "one of the few Internet demi-celebrities who is as clever as she thinks she is, and one of the few leftists anywhere who can be nuanced without being boring". The Verge has called Wynn's "confident and indulgent" persona in ContraPoints as "decadent" in "the mold of Oscar Wilde by way of Weird Twitter," commenting on her postmodern rococo set design and the "bewildering" variety of characters she deploys.

The Atlantic praised the channel's sets, lighting, and music, opining that "the most spectacular attraction [...] is Wynn herself." Polygon named her video on incels one of the 10 best video essays of the year 2018. In May 2019, she topped the Dazed 100 list, which ranks people who "dared to give culture a shot in the arm." ContraPoints won Best Commentary at the 10th Annual Streamy Awards.

=== Pronouns and transmedicalism controversies ===
In September 2019, Wynn described her feelings on Twitter of awkwardness when asked in some contexts to describe her preferred gender pronouns. The tweets were criticized as dismissive of non-binary people who use pronouns other than "he/him" and "she/her."

Linguistics professor Lal Zimman said about pronoun introductions, "Wynn is absolutely right that people engage with that practice in ways that can be somewhat problematic." Following criticism and harassment, Wynn deactivated her Twitter account for a week and then posted an apology. Shortly after, Wynn's video "Opulence" featured a quote from John Waters read by transsexual pornographic actor Buck Angel, whose views on transgender and non-binary people have attracted criticism, including by some who see Angel's opinions as being transmedicalist. Wynn was criticized for using Angel in the video. At the time, Wynn and other YouTubers associated with her channel were widely harassed online.

Wynn's January 2020 video "Canceling" addressed both criticism of her and harassment and the broader context of cancel culture. Robby Soave of Reason praised her stance. In a Guardian interview on her January 2021 video "J.K. Rowling," in which she addressed cancel culture in the context of trans-exclusionary radical feminists, Wynn stated she is "less interested in cancelling Rowling – whose books [...] she enjoyed as a child – than in prompting her [Wynn's] viewers to consider the possibility of their own lurking transphobia," adding that she tries to "take a more humanistic perspective when it comes to the topic of bigotry."

== Personal life ==
Wynn is a transgender woman, a matter prominently featured in her videos. She began her gender transition in 2017. She had previously identified as genderqueer. In 2020, in a video titled "Shame," she came out as a lesbian.

As of 2017, Wynn resides in Baltimore, Maryland.

== Awards ==
Accolades for ContraPoints
Year	Ceremony	Award	Outcome
2019	Break the Internet Awards	YouTuber of the Year	Won
2020	Streamy Awards	Best Commentary	Won
2020	Shorty Awards	YouTuber of the Year	Finalist
2021	Streamy Awards	Best Commentary	Nominated
2022	Peabody Awards	Interactive & Immersive	Won
