= Ipsy =

Beauty subscription service

Personalized Beauty Discovery, Inc.
- Industry: Beauty/Cosmetics
- Founded: 2011
- Founders: Michelle Phan; Marcelo Camberos; Jennifer Jaconetti Goldfarb
- Headquarters: San Mateo, California, U.S.
- Website: www.ipsy.com

IPSY is a beauty product subscription service.

== History ==
IPSY was co-founded in 2011 by YouTube beauty vlogger Michelle Phan; Marcelo Camberos, who joined the company as CEO from Funny or Die; and Jennifer Jaconetti Goldfarb, who joined from Bare Escentuals. The company's initial business model was tested through a beta site called myglam.com offering limited access to monthly Glam Bags in November 2011. IPSY then launched to the public in September 2012 as ipsy.com after raising $3.8 million in seed and Series A funding.

In May 2013, IPSY launched its first live event, Generation Beauty—an annual beauty convention where cosmetics companies, bloggers, and the public could meet. By February 2016, the company had 10,000 vloggers who contributed one or two videos a month dedicated to the subscription service. At the time, Goldfarb stated, "There are hundreds if not millions of beauty content creators online. We want all of them."

In May 2015, IPSY launched Open Studios, a video production co-working space in Santa Monica, California, for nano creators and vloggers associated with the brand. At the studio, creators were provided equipment to produce content for their social media platforms and receive mentoring.

In September 2015, IPSY raised a $100 million Series B round of funding from TPG Growth and Sherpa Capital and the company was valued at about $800M.

In September 2017, IPSY launched an e-commerce section offering beauty products at reduced prices to subscribers. In 2018, IPSY expanded its portfolio to two membership tiers with the introduction of a full-size program called Glam Bag Plus (later renamed BoxyCharm when the companies merged). In 2019, IPSY added Glam Bag Ultimate, a tier featuring both full-size products and deluxe samples. In November 2020, Glam Bag Ultimate was discontinued and replaced with Glam Bag X, a members only upgrade which instead offered 7-8 full-sized products each quarter and was later renamed Icon Box. The products offered in the Icon Box are advertised as curated by different celebrities each quarter. Past curators include Gwen Stefani, Lisa Vanderpump, and Chrissy Teigen.

IPSY launched its first in-house brand, Complex Culture, in 2019 before forming a brand incubator called Madeby Collective. IPSY launched Refreshments in 2020, a line of personal care products advertised as vegan, cruelty-free, and free of parabens, phthalates, and sulfates. The products are also formulated without gluten and nut allergens, and are clinically, allergy, and dermatologist-tested. In August 2020, Madeby Collective collaborated with TikTok personality Addison Rae to release Item Beauty. In June 2021, Madeby Collective collaborated with singer Becky G to release Treslúce Beauty.

In October 2020, IPSY announced it would acquire BoxyCharm, the largest provider of subscriptions for full-size beauty products at the time, for $500 million. The deal also formed a new parent company called Beauty For All (BFA Industries) which would oversee both brands separately.

In February of 2022, BFA Industries secured another $96 million investment from TPG Growth.

The two brands officially came together in 2023 under the IPSY umbrella.

== See also ==
- Social media marketing
- Beauty YouTuber
