= Igor Sinyak =

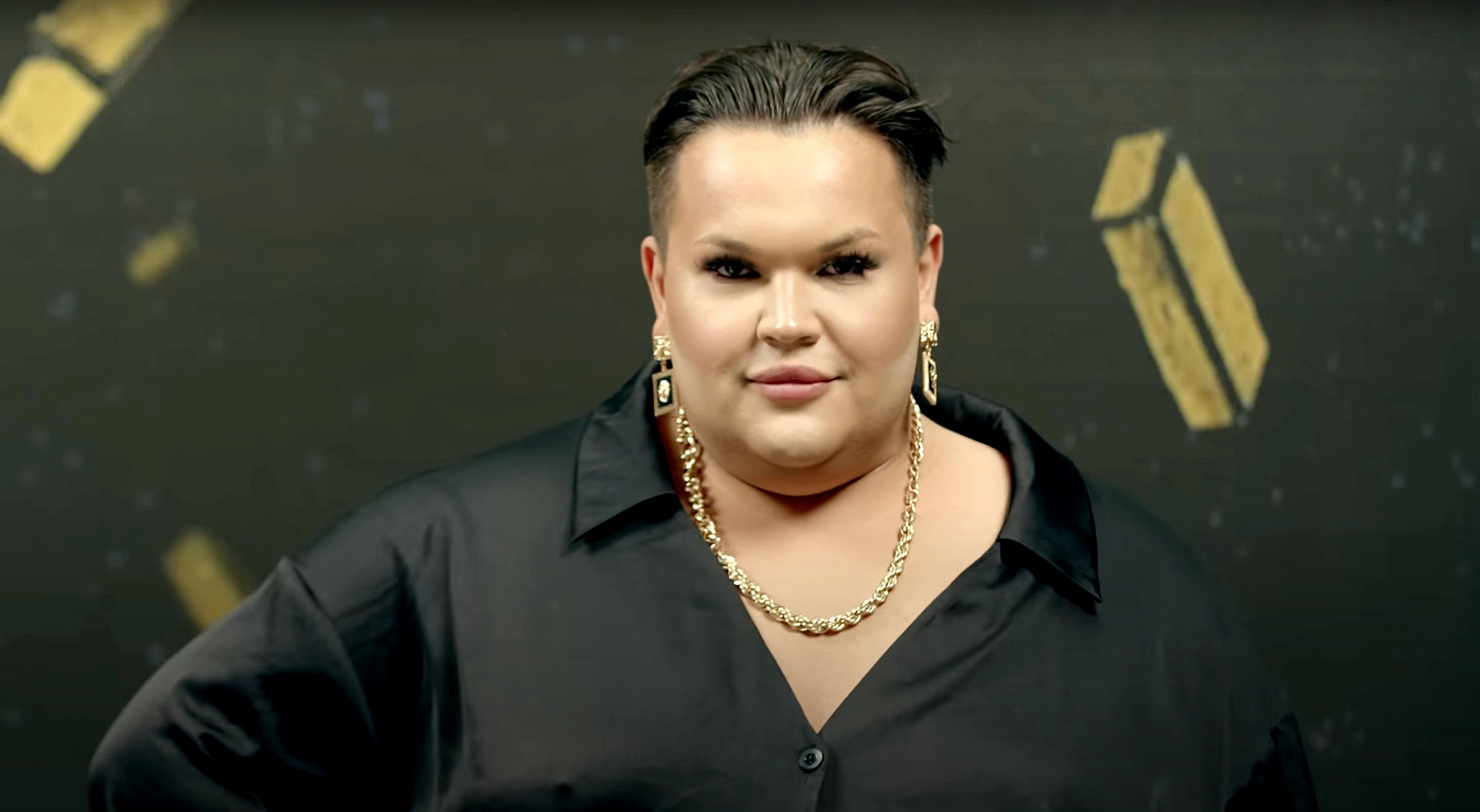
- Igor in the 9th episode of Stenka (2021)
- Born: Igor Vitalyevich Sinyak (Игорь Витальевич Синяк)
- Occupations: Blogger; Singer-songwriter; YouTuber; Beauty vlogger
- Musical career
- Genre: Pop
- Instrument: Vocals

Igor Vitalyevich Sinyak (Russian: Игорь Витальевич Синяк) is a Russian beauty blogger, YouTuber and singer-songwriter of Ukrainian origin, creator and owner of the online community "VPSH" (Russian: ВПШ). Since 2022, he has been running a Telegram channel in the format of a personal blog.

== Biography and career ==
Igor Vitalyevich Sinyak was born in 1992 (or 1995) in Kramatorsk, Donetsk Oblast, Ukraine. He lived in his hometown until the age of 5, when his parents were offered work in Vorkuta. Igor's mother's name is Lyubov Ivanovna Sinyak.

He began his career on YouTube in 2011. His first series was "Vsya pravda shou" (meaning "All the Truth Show") in which Igor criticized and exposed other bloggers in an ironic manner. The videos stood out due to Sinyak's provocative behavior and appearance. Along with the channel, a VKontakte community was created, initially related to the channel's theme, but was eventually blocked by the social network's administration for rule violations. A new community was created and later gradually evolved into a media outlet about Russian-language YouTube (and later, about Russian and CIS celebrities), with its name eventually becoming the abbreviation "VPSH" (pronounced "ve-pe-she"). A few years later, Igor moved back to Ukraine with his family, where he experienced an existential crisis due to a lack of friends in the new place and insecurity about his weight. Overcoming this, Igor found new friends online, and after struggles with weight, lost 66 kilograms and moved to Moscow. There, he finished school, enrolled in journalism, and changed his channel's theme to a beauty blog. In 2021, he ended his career as a YouTuber and afterward began focusing on music and running his Telegram channel as a personal blog.

In 2022, he moved to France and lives in Paris, in the Champs-Élysées district.

== Personal life ==
There is information that in 2016–2017, Igor Sinyak was in a relationship with a woman named Naina Melnikova. The couple released joint videos on YouTube, talking about their relationship. On the other hand, in 2024, Sinyak posted a message on his personal Telegram channel containing the phrase "2013. First love. Moscow", in which he is pictured with a man.

== Videography ==
In 2013, he participated in the TV program "Pryamoy efir" ("Live Broadcast"), where he spoke negatively about the views and activities of Maxim "Tesak" Martsinkevich. After the broadcast, Martsinkevich attempted to confront Sinyak regarding his statements, grabbing him from behind by his sweatshirt.

In 2019, he appeared in the music video for Yegor Creed's song "Love Is".

In November 2021, he participated in the show Polny blekaut ("Full Blackout") on the STS television channel.

== Discography ==
=== Studio albums ===
- 2024 — Музыка для взрослых (meaning "Music for Adults")

=== Singles and EPs ===
- 2015 — "Гимн Ютуба" (meaning "YouTube Anthem") (ft. Irina Vaymer)
- 2015 — "Этим миром правит секс" (meaning "Sex Rules This World")
- 2015 — "Ti Kto Takaya, Bitch?" (feat. Irina Vaymer)
- 2021 — "Двигай" (meaning "Move")
- 2021 — "Самая гейская песня" (meaning "The Gayest Song") (ft. Andrey Petrov)
- 2021 — "Моя любовь мертва" (meaning "My Love is Dead")
- 2022 — "Малыш" (meaning "Baby")
- 2024 — "Дура" (meaning "Fool")
- 2025 — "Падаю" (meaning "I’m Falling") (ft. Lil psina)
- 2026 — “Total Control” (as Angel) "Total Control".

== Awards ==
For the "VPSH" community

In 2016, the community received the "Like za pablik" award from "Vidfest" and the "Best VKontakte Public Page" award from Oops! magazine. In 2020, "VKontakte" awarded it the "Podcast of the Year" award based on the year's results.
