= Jenn McAllister =

American YouTuber and actress (born 1996)

- McAllister on the 2026 Streamer Awards red carpet
- Born: Jennifer Ann McAllister; July 9, 1996 (age 30); Holland, Pennsylvania, U.S.
- Other name: jennxpenn
- Occupations: Internet personality; YouTuber; Actress; Online streamer

YouTube information
- Channels: jennxpenn; jenn
- Years active: 2009–present
- Genres: Lifestyle; comedy; entertainment; gaming
- Subscribers: 3.39 million (main channel); 809 thousand (second channel)
- Views: 385,1 million (main channel); 157 million (second channel)

Jennifer Ann McAllister (born July 9, 1996), also known by her former pseudonym and YouTube username jennxpenn (stylized in all lowercase), is an American internet personality, actress and comedian. She is best known for her work on YouTube, for which she has been nominated for a Shorty Award and four Teen Choice Awards.

McAllister made her acting debut with the GRB Studio film Bad Night (2015), which she also produced. She starred in the YouTube Red web series Foursome (2016–2018), which won her the Streamy Award for Best Actress, and the Hulu series All Night (2018). She is also a published author, with her book Really Professional Internet Person (2015) becoming a New York Times Best Seller.

== Early life ==
McAllister was born on July 9, 1996, in Bucks County, Pennsylvania, where she attended Council Rock High School South in Holland, Pennsylvania, about 25 miles north of Philadelphia. In July 2013, at the age of 16, she moved from her home in Holland, Pennsylvania to Los Angeles, California to pursue her career in the entertainment industry.

== Career ==
McAllister created her YouTube channel jennxpenn at the age of 12 on January 15, 2009, but already had prior YouTube experience through a channel created beforehand with a friend. The channel has amassed over 3.5 million subscribers, and earned her nominations for a Shorty Award for YouTuber of the Year, and four Teen Choice Awards.

In March 2013, McAllister signed a YouTube partnership deal with AwesomenessTV; she appeared primarily in skits and segments on their YouTube channel. She also starred in the pilot episode of AwesomenessTV's sketch comedy series of the same name, which premiered on Nickelodeon on July 1, 2013.

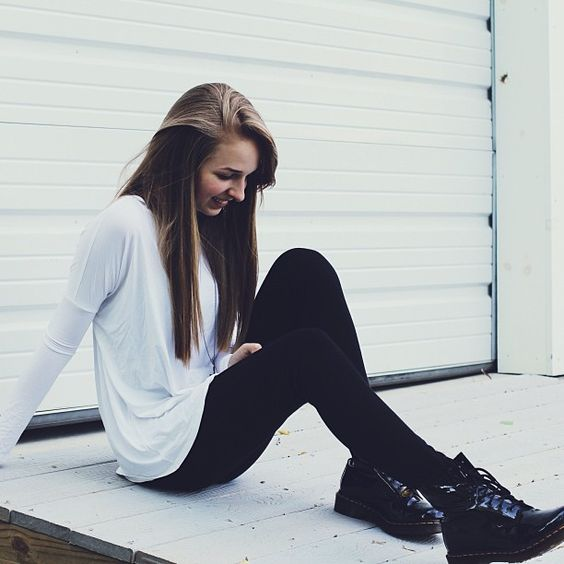
McAllister in 2014

Beginning in April 2014, McAllister went on a 16-city North American tour in celebration of reaching 1 million subscribers on YouTube with Tyler Ward, which took place at the beginning of May and the entirety of June. In June 2014, she signed a YouTube management deal with Fullscreen. In a September 2014 interview with Business Insider, she expressed interest in hosting and acting. That same month, she partnered with the nonprofit organization Our Time, releasing a video telling her viewers aged eighteen or above to register themselves to vote in the United States.

At the 2015 Playlist Live convention, it was announced that McAllister and fellow YouTuber Lauren Elizabeth Luthringshausen would be starring in a film titled Bad Night, which serves as her acting debut. The film was produced by GRB Entertainment, McAllister, and Luthringshausen, among others. It was released through Vimeo on Demand in July of that same year. In an interview with Entertainment Weekly, she described the project as an "amazing experience" and that seeing herself on screen left her "cracking up at the fact that this is a real thing because I can't take myself seriously. So we're going to be hot messes, but I think we'll make it through." Also in 2015, McAllister made her writing debut with the autobiography Really Professional Internet Person, which was released in August 2015 and became a New York Times Best Seller.

In February 2016, it was announced that McAllister would portray the leading role of Andie Fixler in the YouTube Red original series Foursome. In an interview with TheWrap, she described her relationships with the series' cast, stating that "I grew really close to everyone. It was kind of like a summer camp ... I was on set for 12 and a half hours every day, so you're really close with these people." She created content for her channel five to six weeks before production on Foursome began in order to exclusively focus on the series. The series was released in March 2016, and ran for four seasons until the end of 2018. For her performance, she won the Streamy Award for Best Actress at the 6th Annual Streamy Awards, which was presented to her by her friend and frequent collaborator, Andrea Russett. She also received a shared nomination with the cast of Foursome.

In 2018, McAllister was cast in the role of Deanna Hoffman in the Hulu series All Night, which was the second collaboration between AwesomenessTV and Hulu. The series stars a large ensemble of actors and premiered in May 2018.

In 2019, McAllister competed in the first season of The Reality House, a web series inspired by Big Brother where several YouTubers compete for $25,000. She placed 8th out of 13 YouTubers who competed.

At the end of 2021, McAllister stopped posting on her YouTube channel jennxpenn, instead focusing her attention on live streaming on Twitch. She quickly rose to the top 0.04% of streamers on the platform, streaming primarily in the Just Chatting category. She posts edited versions of her live streams on a second YouTube channel which has amassed over 700 thousand subscribers.

In 2026, McAllister was nominated for Best Variety Streamer at the 2026 Streamer Awards.

== Personal life ==
In November 2020, in a video titled "addressing your assumptions about me...", McAllister publicly came out as bisexual, saying she had been identifying as bi in her personal life since she was 19 years old.

In June 2026, McAllister announced her engagement with longtime partner Rachel.

== Filmography ==
=== Film ===
Year	Title	Role	Notes	Ref.
2015	Bad Night	Abby	Also producer	
2016	Hedgehogs	Rose	Voice role	
2017	Guardians of Oz	Gabby	Voice role	
2024	A Stork's Journey 2	Samia	Voice role	

=== Television ===
Year	Title	Role	Notes	Ref.
2013	AwesomenessTV	Herself	Episode: "Zay Zay and Jo Jo's Halloween Tips"	
2016–2018	Foursome	Andie Fixler	Lead role	
2016	Sleep Tight	Emily	Episode: "Special Red"	
2018	All Night	Deanna Hoffman	Main role	
2019	The Reality House	Herself (contestant)	Reality series	

== Bibliography ==
- McAllister, Jenn (2015). Really Professional Internet Person. Scholastic. 224pp. ISBN 9780545861137.

== Awards and nominations ==
Year	Association	Category	Work	Result	Ref.
2014	Teen Choice Awards	Choice Web Star: Comedy	—N/a	Nominated	
2014	Teen Choice Awards	Choice Web Collaboration (Note: Shared with Anthony Quintal, Jack Baran, Andrew Lowe, and Rebecca Black)	Fab Five in Real Life	Nominated	
2015	Teen Choice Awards	Choice Web Star: Female	—N/a	Nominated	
2016	Teen Choice Awards	Choice Web Star: Female	—N/a	Nominated	
2016	Streamy Awards	Best Actress	Foursome	Won	
2016	Streamy Awards	Best Ensemble Cast (Note: Shared with Brooke Markham, Logan Paul, Meghan Falcone and Rickey Thompson)	Foursome	Nominated	
2017	Shorty Awards	YouTuber of the Year	—N/a	Nominated	
2026	The Streamer Awards	Best Variety Streamer	—N/a	Nominated	
2026	Grindr Unwrapped	Streamer of The Year	—N/a	Pending	
