= 2014 Teen Choice Awards =

American awards ceremony held in California

- Date: August 10, 2014
- Location: Shrine Auditorium, Los Angeles, California
- Hosted by: Tyler Posey, Sarah Hyland

Television/radio coverage
- Network: Fox
- Produced by: Production company: Bob Bain Productions, Michael Burg Productions; Producer: Paul Flattery, Kelly Brock, Gregory Sills (supervising producer); Executive producer: Bob Bain, Michael Burg

The 2014 Teen Choice Awards ceremony was held on August 10, 2014 at the Shrine Auditorium in Los Angeles, California. The event was originally scheduled to take place at the UCLA Pauley Pavilion, which was flooded by a broken water pipe on July 29, 2014 near the campus. It was broadcast on Fox at 8:00–10:00 pm ET live/PT tape-delayed. The awards celebrate the year's achievements in music, film, television, sports, fashion, comedy, and the Internet, and were voted on by viewers aged 13 through 19. Selena Gomez was awarded the Ultimate Choice Award during the show.

One Direction were the biggest winners of the night, winning all ten awards they were nominated for (including an award given out to Harry Styles and one dedicated to their fans). The Fault in Our Stars won all seven of its nominations as well, including four awards for Ansel Elgort.

== Voting controversy ==
Tweets from nominees of the newly added Internet categories stirred up questions amongst viewers as Choice Viner Cameron Dallas tweeted to his three million followers that he was informed of winning his Teen Choice Award 6 days before voting ended. Matt Espinosa, another nominee of the night also voiced his opinion as he tweeted, "Basically they picked the people almost 6 days before voting was done and used all of us for promotion." The two viners both deleted their tweets shortly after. However, teens continued to show their outrage. Tweets concerning the voting process flooded Twitter as many upset voters express their opinion of the fixed results. Nevertheless, the TCA rules state that, "Teenasaurus Rox reserves the right to choose the winner from the top four vote generators." Speculation of the significance of the teens' votes continue as it is uncertain of who actually had the most votes in each category.

== Presenters ==
- Taylor Swift — presented Choice Movie Actor: Drama
- Collins Key — introduced Keegan Allen, Tyler Blackburn and Ian Harding
- Keegan Allen, Tyler Blackburn and Ian Harding — presented Choice TV Show: Reality
- Jamie Blackley and Chloë Grace Moretz — presented Choice Movie Actor: Sci-Fi/Fantasy
- Hunter Hayes – introduced Choice Movie Actor: Sci-Fi/Fantasy nominees
- Victoria Justice and Gregg Sulkin — introduced Magic!
- Nina Dobrev and Kellan Lutz — presented Choice Movie Actress: Action
- Cameron Dallas and Bella Thorne — presented Candie's Choice Style Icon
- The Band Perry — presented Choice TV Actress: Drama
- Austin Mahone – introduced Choice TV Actress: Drama nominees
- Jennifer Lopez — presented Choice Movie: Drama
- Odeya Rush and Brenton Thwaites — introduced Rixton
- Colton Haynes and Fifth Harmony — presented Choice Web Stars: Male and Female
- Ciara Bravo, Cat Deeley, Charlie Rowe and Nolan Sotillo — introduced Becky G
- MKTO and Cody Simpson — presented Olay Fresh Effects Breakout Star
- Lea Michele and Paul Wesley — presented Choice Movie: Villain
- Hailee Steinfeld and Nat Wolff — presented Choice Movie Actor: Comedy
- Cameron Diaz – introduced Choice Movie Actor: Comedy nominees
- Ian Somerhalder — presented Choice Music: Female Artist
- Jake T. Austin and Hilary Duff — introduced Jason Derulo

== Performers ==
- Demi Lovato featuring Cher Lloyd — "Really Don't Care"
- Magic! — "Rude"
- Rixton — "Wait on Me" and "Me and My Broken Heart"
- Becky G — "Shower"
- Jason Derulo — "Wiggle" and "Talk Dirty"

== Winners and nominees ==
The first wave of nominees was announced on June 17, 2014. The second wave of nominees was announced on July 17, 2014. There are a total of 88 awards.

Winners are listed first and highlighted in bold text.

=== Movies ===
Choice Movie: Action	Choice Movie Actor: Action
**Divergent**: Edge of Tomorrow; Godzilla; Maleficent; The Mortal Instruments: City of Bones	**Theo James – Divergent**: Jamie Campbell Bower – The Mortal Instruments: City of Bones; Tom Cruise – Edge of Tomorrow; Kellan Lutz – The Legend of Hercules; Mark Wahlberg – Lone Survivor
Choice Movie Actress: Action	Choice Movie: Sci-Fi/Fantasy
**Shailene Woodley – Divergent**: Emily Blunt – Edge of Tomorrow; Lily Collins – The Mortal Instruments: City of Bones; Elle Fanning – Maleficent; Angelina Jolie – Maleficent	**The Hunger Games: Catching Fire**: The Amazing Spider-Man 2; Captain America: The Winter Soldier; Thor: The Dark World; X-Men: Days of Future Past
Choice Movie Actor: Sci-Fi/Fantasy	Choice Movie Actress: Sci-Fi/Fantasy
**Josh Hutcherson – The Hunger Games: Catching Fire**: Chris Evans – Captain America: The Winter Soldier; Andrew Garfield – The Amazing Spider-Man 2; Chris Hemsworth – Thor: The Dark World; Liam Hemsworth – The Hunger Games: Catching Fire	**Jennifer Lawrence – The Hunger Games: Catching Fire and X-Men: Days of Future Past**: Halle Berry – X-Men: Days of Future Past; Scarlett Johansson – Captain America: The Winter Soldier; Natalie Portman – Thor: The Dark World; Emma Stone – The Amazing Spider-Man 2
Choice Movie: Drama	Choice Movie Actor: Drama
**The Fault in Our Stars**: American Hustle; Heaven Is for Real; Million Dollar Arm; Veronica Mars	**Ansel Elgort – The Fault in Our Stars**: Bradley Cooper – American Hustle; Russell Crowe – Noah; Jason Dohring – Veronica Mars; Jon Hamm – Million Dollar Arm
Choice Movie Actress: Drama	Choice Movie: Comedy
**Shailene Woodley – The Fault in Our Stars**: Kristen Bell – Veronica Mars; Sandra Bullock – Gravity; Jennifer Lawrence – American Hustle; Emma Watson – Noah	**The Other Woman**: Anchorman 2: The Legend Continues; Blended; Ride Along; Vampire Academy
Choice Movie Actor: Comedy	Choice Movie Actress: Comedy
**Kevin Hart – Ride Along**: Will Ferrell – Anchorman 2: The Legend Continues; Ice Cube – Ride Along; Johnny Knoxville – Jackass Presents: Bad Grandpa; Adam Sandler – Blended	**Emma Roberts – We're the Millers**: Christina Applegate – Anchorman 2: The Legend Continues; Drew Barrymore – Blended; Zoey Deutch – Vampire Academy; Cameron Diaz – The Other Woman
Choice Movie: Villain	Choice Movie: Scene Stealer
**Donald Sutherland – The Hunger Games: Catching Fire**: Michael Fassbender – X-Men: Days of Future Past; Jamie Foxx – The Amazing Spider-Man 2; Kelsey Grammer – Transformers: Age of Extinction; Kate Winslet – Divergent	**Nat Wolff – The Fault in Our Stars**: Sam Claflin – The Hunger Games: Catching Fire; Nicholas Hoult – X-Men: Days of Future Past; Anthony Mackie – Captain America: The Winter Soldier; Elliot Page – X-Men: Days of Future Past
Choice Movie: Breakout Star	Choice Movie: Chemistry
**Ansel Elgort – The Fault in Our Stars and Divergent**: Theo James – Divergent; Elizabeth Olsen – Godzilla; Nicola Peltz – Transformers: Age of Extinction; Wyatt Russell – 22 Jump Street	**Ansel Elgort, Nat Wolff and Shailene Woodley – The Fault in Our Stars**: Cameron Diaz, Leslie Mann and Kate Upton – The Other Woman; Chris Evans and Anthony Mackie – Captain America: The Winter Soldier; Kevin Hart and Ice Cube – Ride Along; Jonah Hill and Channing Tatum – 22 Jump Street
Choice Movie: Liplock	Choice Movie: Hissy Fit
**Ansel Elgort and Shailene Woodley – The Fault in Our Stars**: Jennifer Aniston, Will Poulter and Emma Roberts – We're the Millers; Chris Evans and Scarlett Johansson – Captain America: The Winter Soldier; Andrew Garfield and Emma Stone – The Amazing Spider-Man 2; Josh Hutcherson and Jennifer Lawrence – The Hunger Games: Catching Fire	**Jonah Hill – 22 Jump Street**: Godzilla – Godzilla; Kevin Hart – Ride Along; Ice Cube – 22 Jump Street; Jason Sudeikis – We're the Millers
Choice Summer Movie	Choice Summer Movie Star
**22 Jump Street**: Dawn of the Planet of the Apes; Earth to Echo; Hercules; Think Like a Man Too; Transformers: Age of Extinction	**Channing Tatum – 22 Jump Street**: Jonah Hill – 22 Jump Street; Dwayne Johnson – Hercules; Melissa McCarthy – Tammy; Mark Wahlberg – Transformers: Age of Extinction

=== Television ===
Choice TV Show: Drama	Choice TV Actor: Drama
**Pretty Little Liars**: The Fosters; Hart of Dixie; Switched at Birth; Twisted	**Ian Harding – Pretty Little Liars**: Keegan Allen – Pretty Little Liars; Jake T. Austin – The Fosters; Lucas Grabeel – Switched at Birth; Avan Jogia – Twisted
Choice TV Actress: Drama	Choice TV Show: Fantasy/Sci-Fi
**Lucy Hale – Pretty Little Liars**: Troian Bellisario – Pretty Little Liars; Rachel Bilson – Hart of Dixie; Maddie Hasson – Twisted; Maia Mitchell – The Fosters	**The Vampire Diaries**: Arrow; Once Upon a Time; Sleepy Hollow; Teen Wolf
Choice TV Actor: Fantasy/Sci-Fi	Choice TV Actress: Fantasy/Sci-Fi
**Ian Somerhalder – The Vampire Diaries**: Josh Dallas – Once Upon a Time; Joseph Morgan – The Originals; Tyler Posey – Teen Wolf; Paul Wesley – The Vampire Diaries	**Nina Dobrev – The Vampire Diaries**: Ginnifer Goodwin – Once Upon a Time; Kat Graham – The Vampire Diaries; Claire Holt – The Originals; Kristin Kreuk – Beauty & the Beast
Choice TV Show: Comedy	Choice TV Actor: Comedy
**The Big Bang Theory**: Austin & Ally; Glee; New Girl; Sam & Cat	**Ross Lynch – Austin & Ally**: Ashton Kutcher – Two and a Half Men; Chord Overstreet – Glee; Jim Parsons – The Big Bang Theory; Andy Samberg – Brooklyn Nine-Nine
Choice TV Actress: Comedy	Choice TV Show: Animated
**Lea Michele – Glee**: Kaley Cuoco – The Big Bang Theory; Mindy Kaling – The Mindy Project; Laura Marano – Austin & Ally; Debby Ryan – Jessie	**The Simpsons**: Adventure Time; Family Guy; Gravity Falls; Regular Show
Choice TV Show: Reality	Choice TV Show: Reality Competition
**Keeping Up with the Kardashians**: Cosmos: A Spacetime Odyssey; Dance Moms; Real Husbands of Hollywood; Total Divas	**The Voice**: The Amazing Race; American Idol; MasterChef Junior; Survivor
Choice TV: Villain	Choice TV: Male Reality Personality
**Dylan O'Brien – Teen Wolf**: Robbie Kay – Once Upon a Time; Jane Lynch – Glee; Janel Parrish – Pretty Little Liars; Paul Wesley – The Vampire Diaries	**Adam Levine – The Voice**: Nick Cannon – America's Got Talent; Rob Dyrdek – Ridiculousness; Max Joseph and Nev Schulman – Catfish: The TV Show; Ryan Seacrest – American Idol
Choice TV: Female Reality Personality	Choice TV: Male Scene Stealer
**Shakira – The Voice**: Cat Deeley – So You Think You Can Dance; The Kardashians and Jenner Sisters – Keeping Up with the Kardashians; Jennifer Lopez – American Idol; Abby Lee Miller – Dance Moms	**Tyler Hoechlin – Teen Wolf**: Darren Criss – Glee; Adam DeVine – Modern Family; Tahj Mowry – Baby Daddy; Michael Trevino – The Vampire Diaries
Choice TV: Female Scene Stealer	Choice TV: Male Breakout Star
**Candice Accola – The Vampire Diaries**: Mayim Bialik – The Big Bang Theory; Sarah Hyland – Modern Family; Naya Rivera – Glee; Eden Sher – The Middle	**Brett Dalton – Agents of S.H.I.E.L.D.**: Richard Brancatisano – Chasing Life; Tom Mison – Sleepy Hollow; Miguel Pinzon – Mystery Girls; Toby Regbo – Reign
Choice TV: Female Breakout Star	Choice TV: Breakout Show
**Sasha Pieterse – Pretty Little Liars**: Nicole Beharie – Sleepy Hollow; Dove Cameron – Liv and Maddie; Adelaide Kane – Reign; Emily Bett Rickards – Arrow	**Faking It**: Being Mary Jane; Chasing Life; Reign; Sleepy Hollow
Choice Summer TV Show	Choice Summer TV Star: Male
**Wipeout**: Baby Daddy; Girl Meets World; So You Think You Can Dance; Under the Dome; Young & Hungry	**Tyler Blackburn – Pretty Little Liars**: Jean-Luc Bilodeau – Baby Daddy; David Lambert – The Fosters; Tyler Posey – Teen Wolf; Mike Vogel – Under the Dome
Choice Summer TV Star: Female	
**Ashley Benson – Pretty Little Liars**: Shay Mitchell – Pretty Little Liars; Emily Osment – Young & Hungry; Cierra Ramirez – The Fosters; Italia Ricci – Chasing Life	

=== Music ===
Choice Music: Male Artist	Choice Music: Female Artist
**Ed Sheeran**: Jason Derulo; Austin Mahone; Pitbull; Justin Timberlake; Pharrell Williams	**Ariana Grande**: Beyoncé; Miley Cyrus; Lorde; Katy Perry; Taylor Swift
Choice Music: Group	Choice Music: Electronic Dance Music Artist
**One Direction**: 5 Seconds of Summer; Fifth Harmony; R5; Rixton	**Calvin Harris**: Martin Garrix; Kaskade; Skrillex; Zedd
Choice Music: R&B/Hip-Hop Artist	Choice Music: Rock Group
**Iggy Azalea**: Eminem; John Legend; Nicki Minaj; Justin Timberlake	**Imagine Dragons**: The Black Keys; Coldplay; OneRepublic; Paramore
Choice Music: Male Country Artist	Choice Music: Female Country Artist
**Hunter Hayes**: Luke Bryan; Jake Owen; Blake Shelton; Keith Urban	**Taylor Swift**: Jana Kramer; Miranda Lambert; Kacey Musgraves; Carrie Underwood
Choice Music: Country Group	Choice Music Single: Male
**Lady Antebellum**: The Band Perry; Florida Georgia Line; Parmalee; Zac Brown Band	**"Sing" – Ed Sheeran**: "Happy" – Pharrell Williams; "Mmm Yeah" – Austin Mahone featuring Pitbull; "Stay with Me – Sam Smith; "Talk Dirty" – Jason Derulo featuring 2 Chainz
Choice Music Single: Female	Choice Music Single: Group
**"Problem" – Ariana Grande featuring Iggy Azalea**: "Dark Horse" – Katy Perry featuring Juicy J; "Fancy" – Iggy Azalea featuring Charli XCX; "Let It Go" – Idina Menzel; "Team" – Lorde	**"Story of My Life" – One Direction**: "Boss" – Fifth Harmony; "Me and My Broken Heart" – Rixton; "Rude" – Magic!; "She Looks So Perfect" – 5 Seconds of Summer
Choice Music: Country Song	Choice Music: R&B/Hip-Hop Song
**"This Is How We Roll" – Florida Georgia Line featuring Luke Bryan**: "Bartender" – Lady Antebellum; "Beachin'" – Jake Owen; "Play It Again" – Luke Bryan; "Somethin' Bad" – Miranda Lambert and Carrie Underwood	**"Fancy" – Iggy Azalea featuring Charli XCX**: "All of Me" – John Legend; "Na Na" – Trey Songz; "Pills n Potions" – Nicki Minaj; "Turn Down for What" – DJ Snake and Lil Jon
Choice Music: Rock Song	Choice Music: Electronic Music Dance Song
**"Pompeii" – Bastille**: "Ain't It Fun" – Paramore; "Love Runs Out" – OneRepublic; "Maps" – Maroon 5; "On Top of the World" – Imagine Dragons	**"Wake Me Up!" – Avicii**: "#Selfie" – The Chainsmokers; "Animals" – Martin Garrix; "Latch" – Disclosure featuring Sam Smith; "Summer" – Calvin Harris
Choice Music: Love Song	Choice Music: Break-Up Song
**"You & I" – One Direction**: "All of Me" – John Legend; "Boom Clap" – Charli XCX; "Not a Bad Thing" – Justin Timberlake; "Somebody to You" – The Vamps featuring Demi Lovato	**"Story of My Life" – One Direction**: "Amnesia" – 5 Seconds of Summer; "Break Free" – Ariana Grande featuring Zedd; "Miss Movin' On" – Fifth Harmony; "Really Don't Care" – Demi Lovato featuring Cher Lloyd
Choice Music: Breakout Artist	Choice Music: Breakout Group
**Austin Mahone**: Becky G; Rita Ora; Cody Simpson; Zendaya	**5 Seconds of Summer**: Fifth Harmony; MKTO; Rixton; The Vamps
Choice Summer Song	Choice Summer Music Star: Male
**"Really Don't Care" – Demi Lovato featuring Cher Lloyd**: "Fancy" – Iggy Azalea featuring Charli XCX; "Rude" – Magic!; "Summer" – Calvin Harris; "Wiggle" – Jason Derulo featuring Snoop Dogg	**Jason Derulo**: Luke Bryan; John Legend; Sam Smith; Pharrell Williams
Choice Summer Music Star: Female	Choice Summer Music Star: Group
**Demi Lovato**: Iggy Azalea; Becky G; Ariana Grande; Nicki Minaj	**5 Seconds of Summer**: Fifth Harmony; Florida Georgia Line; Magic!; Rixton
Choice Summer Tour	
**Where We Are Tour – One Direction**: The 20/20 Experience World Tour – Justin Timberlake; On the Run Tour – Beyoncé and Jay Z; Prismatic World Tour – Katy Perry; That's My Kind of Night Tour – Luke Bryan	

=== Fashion ===
Choice Male Hottie	Choice Female Hottie
**One Direction**: Zac Efron; Ryan Gosling; Liam Hemsworth; Austin Mahone; Ian Somerhalder	**Selena Gomez**: Beyoncé; Ariana Grande; Kendall Jenner; Rihanna; Bella Thorne

=== Sports ===
Choice Male Athlete	Choice Female Athlete
**LeBron James**: Kevin Durant; Dale Earnhardt Jr.; Tim Howard; Johnny Manziel; Russell Wilson	**Serena Williams**: Meryl Davis; Lucy Li; Candace Parker; Danica Patrick; Amy Purdy

=== Miscellaneous ===
Choice Comedian	Choice Smile
**Kevin Hart**: Jimmy Fallon; Mindy Kaling; Andy Samberg; Kenan Thompson	**Harry Styles**: Selena Gomez; Demi Lovato; Austin Mahone; Taylor Swift
Choice Candie's Style Icon	
**Zendaya**: Iggy Azalea; Ashley Benson; Kendall Jenner; Emma Roberts	

=== Web ===
Choice Web Star: Male	Choice Web Star: Female
**Tyler Oakley**: Cameron Dallas; Connor Franta; Joey Graceffa; Shawn Mendes; Troye Sivan	**Bethany Mota**: Grace Helbig; iJustine; Michelle Phan; Andrea Russett; Zoella
Choice Web Star: Comedy	Choice Web Star: Music
**Our2ndLife**: Colleen Ballinger; Hannah Hart; Lohanthony; Jenn McAllister; Brittani Louise Taylor	**Shawn Mendes**: Boyce Avenue; Cimorelli; Christina Grimmie; Megan and Liz; Lindsey Stirling
Choice Web Star: Fashion/Beauty	Choice Web Star: Gaming
**Zoella**: Elle and Blair Fowler; Bunny Meyer; Bethany Mota; Ingrid Nilsen; Michelle Phan	**PewDiePie**: Joey Graceffa; iHasCupquake; iJustine; Toby Turner
Choice Web: Collaboration	Choice Social Media King
**Tyler Oakley and Troye Sivan**: Jack Baran, Rebecca Black, Lohanthony, Andrew Lowe and Jenn McAllister; Alfie Deyes and Ariana Grande; Daniel Howell and Phil Lester; JacksGap and PrankvsPrank	**One Direction**: Justin Bieber; Ashton Kutcher; Ian Somerhalder; Justin Timberlake
Choice Social Media Queen	Choice Twit
**Katy Perry**: Lady Gaga; Rihanna; Britney Spears; Taylor Swift	**One Direction**: Justin Bieber; Demi Lovato; Katy Perry; Ian Somerhalder
Choice Instagrammer	Choice Viner
**Miley Cyrus**: Justin Bieber; Selena Gomez; Rihanna; Taylor Swift	**Cameron Dallas**: Matthew Espinosa; Jack & Jack; Shawn Mendes; Lele Pons
Choice Fanatic Fans	
**One Direction**: Fifth Harmony; Ariana Grande; Demi Lovato; Taylor Swift	
