= Michelle Phan =

American makeup artist and YouTuber (born 1986/1987)

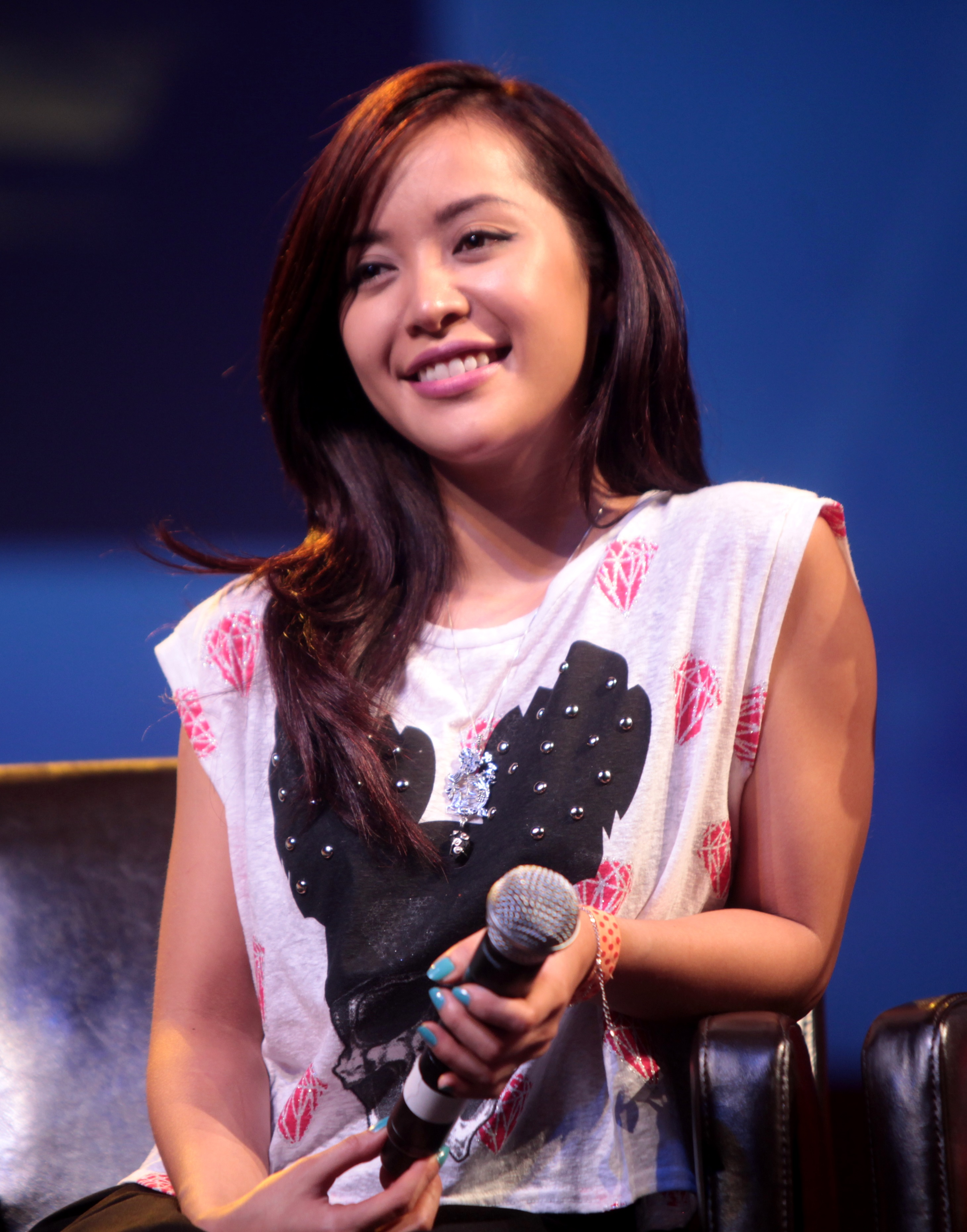
- Phan in 2018
- Born: 1986 or 1987 (age 39–40)
- Education: Honorary Doctorate of Arts degree, Ringling College of Art and Design, 2014
- Occupations: Entrepreneur; influencer; Beauty YouTuber
- Years active: 2007–present

YouTube information
- Channel: Michelle Phan
- Years active: 2006–present
- Genres: Beauty and make-up; vlogs
- Subscribers: 8.62 million
- Views: 1.05 billion
- Last updated: September 16, 2024
- Website: michellephan.com

Michelle Phan (born 1986 or 1987) is an American YouTube personality and entrepreneur. She is the founder and owner of EM Cosmetics, a cosmetics brand she relaunched in 2017.

== Early life and education ==
Phan Tuyết Băng Michelle was raised in Tampa, Florida, alongside her elder brother and younger half-sister. Phan has publicly discussed her family's financial struggles, including her father's gambling addiction and mother’s separation from her stepfather.

She attended Tampa Bay Technical High School before enrolling at Ringling College of Art and Design. Due to financial constraints, she left the college before completing her degree. In 2014, she was awarded an Honorary Doctorate of Arts degree from Ringling College.

== Career ==
=== Blog and YouTube career ===
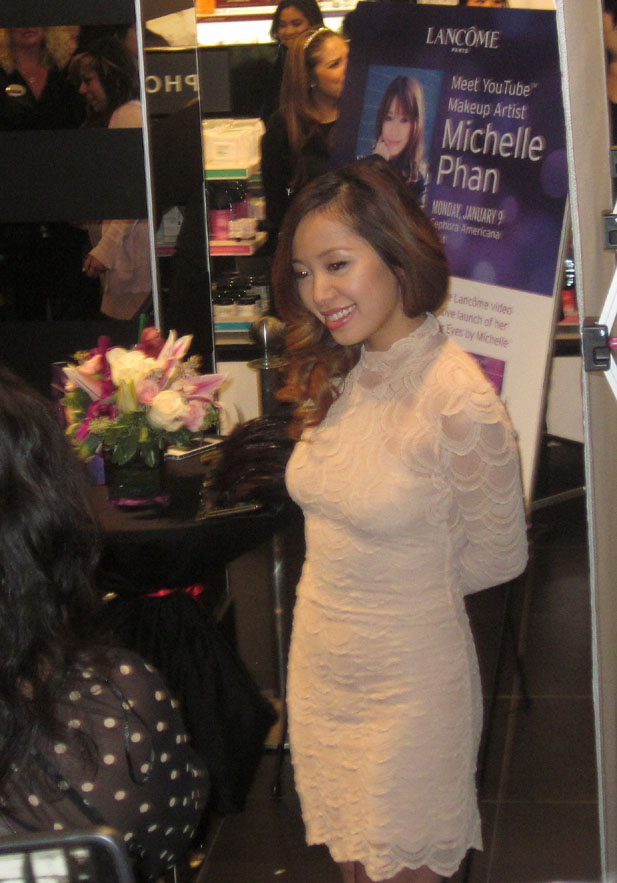
Michelle Phan in 2012 at a Sephora in Glendale, California

In 2005, Phan had a personal blog where she posted makeup tutorials, which led to her followers requesting more. She began posting tutorial vlogs on Xanga under the username "Ricebunny" and then began posting on YouTube in May 2007.

BuzzFeed featured two of Phan's "How To Get Lady Gaga's Eyes" makeup tutorials in 2009 and 2010, which helped them go viral and brought her over a million subscribers. In 2010, Lancôme made Phan their official video makeup artist after she featured some of their products in her videos, making her the company's first Vietnamese-American spokesperson.

In 2015, Phan was named to the Inc. 30 under 30 and Forbes 30 under 30 lists. The same year, she raised $100 million to value the company Ipsy at over $500 million.

Phan abruptly went on hiatus from YouTube in 2015. On June 1, 2017, Phan returned with her first video since the hiatus explaining why she took her break. Phan cited legal troubles, the failure of EM Cosmetics' initial launch, and her issues with self-image as what led her to take a break. She continued her hiatus until officially returning to YouTube in September 2019.

=== Business ventures ===
In 2011, Phan co-founded MyGlam, a monthly beauty product subscription service. It launched in September 2012 and has since been renamed Ipsy. Ipsy is a sponsor of the Generation Beauty conference. Phan became a YouTube advertising partner and launched FAWN, a YouTube MCN (multi-channel network), in 2012.

On August 15, 2013, L'Oreal launched a new cosmetic line called EM Cosmetics by Michelle Phan, dedicating the brand to her mother. In April 2015, Phan bought L'Oréal's share of EM Cosmetics through Ipsy, which she confirmed on her Instagram in December 2016; she later acquired the company from Ipsy and relaunched it in April 2017. During this time, Phan also resigned from Ipsy in order to focus on EM Cosmetics.

In May 2014, Phan announced her partnership with Endemol Beyond USA to build a talent network to feature people from YouTube and create content for millennials. The ICON network, dedicated to "beauty, lifestyle and entertainment," launched in March 2015 online and on television via Roku. In September 2014, Phan partnered with Cutting Edge Group to launch Shift Music Group. Phan published a book with Random House in October 2014, titled Make Up: Your Life Guide to Beauty, Style, and Success -- Online and Off.

Phan was a client of disgraced lawyer Michael Avenatti, who allegedly embezzled $4 million from Phan.

=== Other career ventures ===
In 2017, Phan launched a webtoon titled Helios: Femina. In 2021, Phan lent her voice to Blackberry Cookie, a character in the video game Cookie Run: Kingdom, which was uncredited in-game.

== Personal life ==
Phan is a believer of alternative medicine and has promoted products and beliefs based on pseudoscience.

=== Copyright infringement lawsuit ===
In July 2014, Ultra Records sued Phan in the United States District Court for Los Angeles for copyright infringement relating to the music used in her YouTube videos. Ultra sought up to $150,000 in damages per infringement for up to 50 instances of alleged infringement, for a total of up to $7.5 million. Phan's representatives stated that she had received permission from Ultra to use the music, and Phan filed a countersuit against Ultra Records on September 18, 2014, in the United States District Court for the Central District of California. In August 2015, both suit and countersuit were dropped when both parties agreed to settle out of court. The terms of the agreement were not made public.

== Awards and nominations ==
Year	Nominated	Award	Result
2014	Michelle Phan	Teen Choice Award for Choice Web Star: Fashion/Beauty	Nominated
2014	Michelle Phan	Teen Choice Award for Choice Web Star: Female	Nominated
2014	Michelle Phan	Streamy Award for Inspiration Icon Award	Won
2014	Michelle Phan	Shorty Award for Best YouTube Guru	Won
2015	Michelle Phan	Teen Choice Award for Choice Web Star: Fashion/Beauty	Nominated
2015	Michelle Phan	Teen Choice Award for Choice Web Star: Female	Nominated
2016	Michelle Phan	Teen Choice Award for Choice Web Star: Fashion/Beauty	Nominated

== Publications ==
- Make Up: Your Life Guide to Beauty, Style, and Success -- Online and Off. Penguin–Random House. 2014. ISBN 9780804137348.
