= Jack Baran =

American YouTube personality

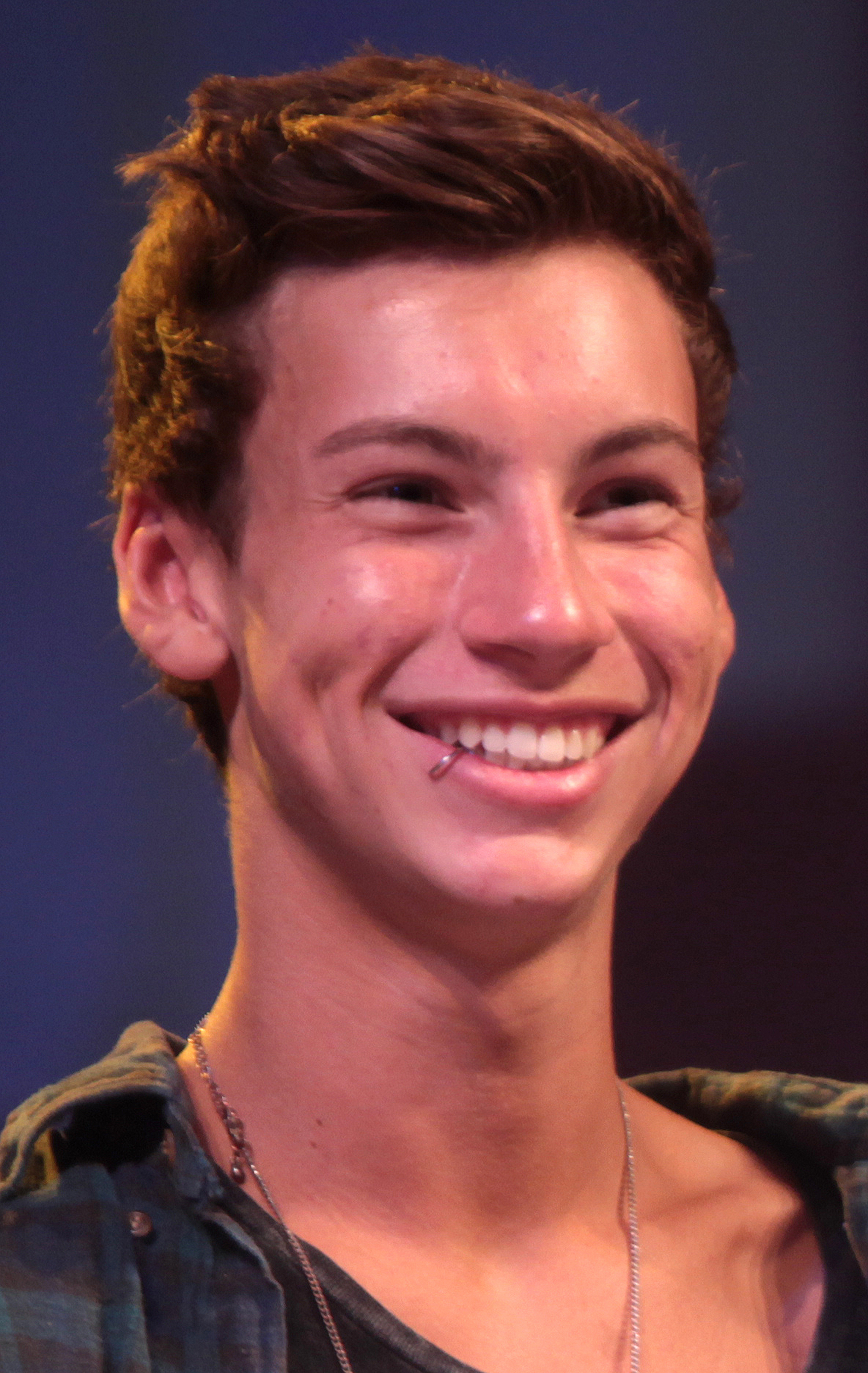
- Baran at VidCon 2014
- Born: Jack Matthew Baran; January 13, 1997 (age 29); Fairfield, Connecticut, U.S.
- Occupation: YouTube personality

YouTube information
- Channel: thatsojack
- Years active: 2010–2020
- Subscribers: 1.17 million
- Views: 91.6 million
- Last updated: December 12, 2025

Jack Matthew Baran (born January 13, 1997), also known on YouTube as thatsojack, is an American YouTube personality.

== Early life ==
Baran was born in Fairfield, Connecticut on January 13, 1997. He attended and graduated from Fairfield Warde High School in 2014.

== Career ==
Baran created his YouTube channel in 2010 and now primarily uploads lifestyle and vlog videos. In early 2015, Baran starred in an AwesomenessTV skit alongside Paulina Cerrilla, portraying a Starbucks barista. In the summer of 2015, Baran and fellow YouTube personality Jenn McAllister (jennxpenn) began starring in an AwesomenessTV series titled First Times with Jack + Jenn. In December 2016 Jack Baran, along with co-stars Gabbie Hanna, Andrew Lowe, Chachi Gonzales, and Ricky Dillon, went across the United States lip-syncing as part of the Drop the Mic Tour.

In 2017, Baran hosted a game show on Snapchat for the Grammy Awards, quizzing people on the streets about their knowledge of the awards show.

== Personal life ==
Baran currently resides in Los Angeles, California. On July 24, 2015, Baran uploaded a video to his YouTube channel, titled I'm Gay, announcing that he is gay. Baran was active on all of his social media April 2019 and thereafter he deleted his YouTube, Twitter, and Instagram accounts. On July 5, 2020, he reactivated his YouTube channel and his Twitter, however not much activity has come from his social media since, as he referenced in his video he is taking time to work on himself and will update fans when he is comfortable sharing his journey.

== Awards and nominations ==
Year	Nominated	Award	Result
2014	Fab Five in Real Life with Jenn McAllister, Anthony Quintal, Andrew Lowe, and Rebecca Black	Teen Choice Award for Choice Web Collaboration	Nominated
