= Cameron Moulène =

French-American actor

- Born: 25 November 1993 (age 32); Paris, France
- Occupation: Actor
- Children: 1

Cameron Moulène (born 25 November 1993) is a French-American actor. He is well known for playing Will Armstrong in the MTV series Happyland (2014) and Josh Bennett on the YouTube Red series Foursome (2016–2018).

== Early life ==
Moulène was born in Paris but moved to Los Angeles when he was two years old. He studied at the Lee Strasberg Theater and Film Institute and at the Royal Academy of Dramatic Art in London. He also holds a Masters in Business Certificate from the London School of Economics.

== Career ==
When he was chosen to play Orlando in As You Like It in a school production, his interest in acting sparked. He appeared in recurring roles in television series such as Raising Hope, The Secret Life of the American Teenager and The Cleaner.

In 2014, Moulène was chosen to play Will Armstrong in the MTV comedy Happyland, which ran for a single season. Following the cancellation of the series, he joined Faking It, another MTV comedy.

Moulène was a series regular in the YouTube Red series Foursome, starring as Josh Bennett from 2016 to 2018.

In 2020, Moulène had a recurring role in the Hulu miniseries A Teacher.

Cameron has also found success as an entrepreneur. He has founded multiple companies since 2019, most notably a logistics company which handled testing and screenings for the entertainment sector and a crypto focused entertainment studio called Non-Fungible Films.

== Personal life ==
He speaks fluent French, English and Spanish, as well as broken Italian and Malagasy. Moulène is Jewish.

He has a son named August.

== Filmography ==
=== Television ===
Year	Title	Role	Notes
2008	The Cleaner	Charlie Mintz	
2009	The Secret Life of the American Teenager	Mark	
2010–2012	Raising Hope	Teenage Burt	
2013	Longmire	Troy Thayer	
2013	Jackie	Frank Sterling	
2014	Happyland	Will Armstrong	Main Role (Season 1)
2015	Dropping the Soap	Kenny	
2015	Faking It	Wade	
2016	Betch	Aaron	
2016–2018	Foursome	Josh Bennett	Main Role
2020	A Teacher	Cody	

=== Film ===
Year	Film	Role	Notes
2007	On The Doll	Young Jaron	
2018	Haunting on Fraternity Row	Grant	
2021	Shoplifters of the World	David	
