= Happyland (TV series) =

American comedy-drama television series

- Genre: Comedy drama
- Created by: Ben Epstein
- Starring: Bianca A. Santos; Camille Guaty; Shane Harper; Cameron Moulène; Katherine McNamara; Ryan Rottman
- Country of origin: United States
- Original language: English
- No. of seasons: 1
- No. of episodes: 8

Production
- Executive producers: Jill Cargerman; Craig Zadan; Neil Meron
- Camera setup: Single-camera
- Running time: 22 minutes
- Production company: Storyline Entertainment

Original release
- Network: MTV
- Release: September 30 – November 18, 2014

Happyland is an American comedy drama television series created by Ben Epstein. The series aired for one eight-episode season from September 30 through November 18, 2014, on MTV. On January 8, 2015, MTV officially cancelled the series.

== Plot ==
Happyland follows the reality of the park workers of one of the most popular theme parks in America. The series centers on Lucy, the cynical daughter of the park's Princess Adriana, who, after deciding that she wants to leave the park and experience something real, is swept off her feet by the new park owner's son, Ian, not knowing that Ian is one of her half brothers and the park owner is her real dad.

== Cast ==
Main cast

- Bianca Santos as Lucy Velez, is the secret love child of Elena Velez and James Chandler, who was raised by her single mother and not knowing who her dad is. When she first kisses Ian, her mother interrupts them and reveals that Ian is her brother, also revealing that her dad is James Chandler. When she and Ian are partnered together as Princess Adriana and Prince Valor, she freaks out when they have to kiss and tells him that they are siblings. Soon after, they discover that they are not siblings and kiss again.
- Camille Guaty as Elena Velez, is the mother of Lucy and has been working in Happyland amusement park for 20 years as Princess Adriana. When she was in her late teens, she had a fling with James and became pregnant with Lucy. After he discovered the pregnancy, he left for New York with his family, leaving Elena to be a single mother. She kept the identity of Lucy's dad a secret.
- Shane Harper as Ian Chandler, is the son of James and brother of Theodore. Ian first meets Lucy when he is high inside the Ricky Raccoon costume and faints on stage. When Ian and Lucy are doing a scene together, she reveals to him that they are brother and sister. Later they discover they are not brother and sister. He is also a Love Child.
- Ryan Rottman as Theodore "Theo" Chandler, is the son of James and older brother of Ian and Lucy. Theodore works in the Happyland executive department under his father. He is also unaware that he is related to Lucy.
- Katherine McNamara as Harper Munroe, is Lucy's friend and Will's girlfriend. She is insecure about her relationship with Will because she believes he is in love with Lucy.
- Cameron Moulene as Will Armstrong, is Lucy's best friend and Harper's boyfriend. He is possibly in love with Lucy but can't admit it. When he meets Ian, he becomes jealous of his relationship with Lucy and acts out.

Recurring cast

- Brady Smith as James Chandler, owner of Happyland. He is the father of Theodore, Ian, and Lucy. He is involved with Elena, although he is married to Margot Chandler.
- Chris Sheffield as Noah Watson. He is a college intern at Happyland and dated Lucy for a short while before she found out that he was cheating on her.
- Josh Groban as "Dirty" Dave, a Happyland bartender. He is a long-time employee and therefore knows a lot about the people that come and out of the park.
- Danielle Bisutti as Margot Chandler, the wife of James and the mother of Theodore and Ian. She is unaware of James and Elena's affair, although she might have some secrets of her own.

== Episodes ==
No.	Title	Directed by	Written by	Original release date	U.S. viewers (millions)
1	"Pilot"	Lee Toland Krieger	Ben Epstein	September 30, 2014	0.42
Lucy is on a quest to get away from the park's manufactured happiness and be part of something real. Elena reveals a secret to Lucy.
2	"Price of Admission"	Ryan Shiraki	Jill Cargerman	October 7, 2014	0.43
A house party within Dazzle (the Happyland owned town) brings a new flirtation in the form of a college intern and a fight with Harper that leaves Lucy reeling.
3	"Never Break Character"	Peter Lauer	Ben Epstein	October 14, 2014	0.35
Lucy and Ian must pass character training together to continue getting paid, and with a looming, eviction Lucy is highly motivated. Ian however is not. And Will gets in a fight defending Lucy's honor, leaving Harper jilted.
4	"Park Maintenance"	Peter Lauer	Joanna Calo	October 21, 2014	0.27
At an employee only night in Happyland, Lucy is on an emotional rollercoaster after catching Harper with Ian. Though her attempts to repair her "Happyland family" fail, a new crush in Noah might take the pain away.
5	"Repeated Infractions"	Rebecca Asher	Peter Warren	October 28, 2014	0.40
Lucy and Noah's first night out becomes an unwelcome double date with Harper and Ian. When Lucy goes off to help Harper, she gets arrested. Meanwhile, Will helps Theo with an outrageous request.
6	"Disorderly Conduct"	Rebecca Asher	Erica Harrell	November 4, 2014	0.37
After learning that Ian got Will his new job at the park, Will and Ian immediately bond. Meanwhile, Lucy plans to go on a trip with Noah to visit his college. However, after Will and Ian find out what kinda of guy Noah is, they convince Lucy that she doesn't need to go off with him.
7	"Leave of Absence"	David Katzenberg	Jill Cargerman	November 11, 2014	0.35
Elena and James started to become romantic once again but when an unexpected guest at a wedding it happens to turn out to being James' wife. Will and Lucy began dating until Theo figures out Lucy's secret and attempts to rid Lucy and Elena of his father.
8	"Your Happyland Family"	David Katzenberg	Ben Epstein	November 18, 2014	0.40
Lucy finds out that Ian might not actually be her brother and doesn't know if she should share the news. When James shows up at Elena and Lucy's place one night, he figures out the truth about Lucy. Later, it is revealed that Theodore had always known that Ian wasn't a real Chandler and Ian is furious. Lucy and Ian's feelings re-emerge and Will and Harper walk in on them making out.

== Reception ==
On Rotten Tomatoes, the series has an aggregate review score of 56% based on 5 positive and 4 negative critic reviews.
