= Beauty beggar =

Internet slang

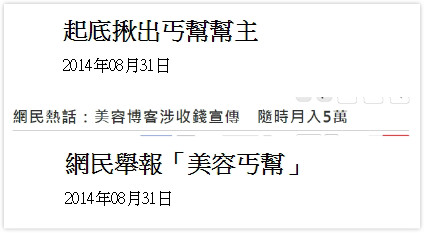
News report on beauty beggars

Beauty beggar (Chinese: 美容丐幫; Jyutping: mei5 jung4 koi3 bong1) is a derogatory name for beauty bloggers or beauty YouTubers who capitalize on their fame by promoting cosmetics to obtain sponsorship, in the form of testers or money, from cosmetics companies. The term is Hong Kong internet slang that originated from discussions on Instagram and the Hong Kong Golden Forum.

== Definition ==
Involved Internet users claim that beauty beggars have these following characteristics: some of the introductions are self-contradictory or of poor quality; the declaration of interest is lacking in the presentations; they overcharge sponsorship either from public relations agencies or cosmetics companies; etc.

Tsui Yuen (Chinese: 徐緣), a Hong Kong columnist who specialises in marketing, pointed out that beauty begging abuses the "word of mouth" marketing model. Also, Janice Wong, a Hong Kong fashion critic, believes that the prototype of beauty beggar is the advertorial on "personal media" (Chinese: 自媒體) platforms.

In 2014, after some Internet users reported beauty beggars to the Customs and Excise Department in Hong Kong, the spokesman of Hong Kong Customs announced that they would follow up the case because beauty beggars might have violated section 13E of the Trade Descriptions Ordinance, which covers "misleading omissions". The official indicated that because cases vary, more investigation and evidence are required to make fair judgements.

== Origin ==
Beauty beggars originated from local beauty bloggers in Hong Kong, who want to share their experience of using beauty products with other Internet users. With their followers accumulating, some popular beauty bloggers may be invited by public relations agencies or cosmetics companies to promote beauty products. Thus, even if a product is not effective, these beauty bloggers may still give positive reviews on it. Some beauty bloggers were found to disguise the products that they get from public relations agencies as self-purchased products so as to raise the credibility of the promoting products. Moreover, some famous bloggers might sell the samples that they obtained from public relations agencies to viewers to earn extra profits. Customers who bought those products then discovered that they did not work or might cause allergic problems. Also, some beauty bloggers price their blog, Facebook page, or YouTube video to ask for extra sponsorship from involved companies. Therefore, some Internet users criticize them as beauty beggars.

== Development ==
Because of the increasing trend of using social networking sites like YouTube and web blogs, people love to share their experience of using various products or collect useful information for daily use. In addition, the continuous inflow of cosmetics and skin care products, especially from Korea and Taiwan, has raised the needs of beauty information for potential customers. Customers believe that they can rely on beauty bloggers' experience to choose beauty products that suit them most. This in turn created a need for beauty bloggers. Beauty bloggers use either videos or texts to comment on different brands of beauty products after use. Thus, their audience can use their reviews or self-used reports as references before purchasing those beauty products. Some public relation agencies invited them to recommend some products by giving them some testers, but the article they wrote are similar to advertisements, since they simply give positive comments on those products.

As YouTube becomes more popular, the sharing form transfers from writing articles to making videos, so many beauty bloggers became beauty YouTubers, who are likely to be paid according to the number of likes for their YouTube clips. It was reported that some popular beauty YouTubers ask for HK$40,000 to 50,000 for each YouTube clip.

== Objections ==
Some Internet users created Facebook pages and webforums to object to beauty beggars. To gather related information and propaganda, Internet users also established a fan club on a YouTube platform and set up their database in Google Document and Instagram. In 2014, after some Internet users posted on the Golden Forum claiming that they had obtained evidence of beauty beggars' behind-the-scenes deals, some beauty bloggers were the target of doxing.

=== Criticisms ===
Many Hong Kong Internet users opposed beauty beggars, and some of them listed several reasons for opposing them. A famous blogger summarized these reasons why people are against beauty beggars according to their voices:

- Misusing the YouTube platform.
- Posting advertisements instead of useful information.
- Poor quality of posts.
- Concealing drawbacks of their products and exaggerating the effects of products.
