= Foursome (2016 TV series) =

American romantic comedy streaming series

- Genre: Teen drama Comedy
- Created by: Marissa Read; Selyna Warre
- Directed by: Amy York Rubin
- Starring: Jenn McAllister; Meghan Falcone; Brooke Markham; Rickey Thompson; Logan Paul; Cameron Moulène; Rahart Adams; Madeline Whitby; Sarah Yarkin; Monica Sherer; John Milhiser; Jared Wernick; Tucker Albrizzi
- Country of origin: United States
- Original language: English
- No. of seasons: 4
- No. of episodes: 36

Production
- Executive producers: Marissa Read; Selyna Warren; Shauna Phelan
- Producer: Irina Popov
- Running time: 22 minutes
- Production company: AwesomenessTV

Original release
- Network: YouTube Premium
- Release: March 30, 2016 – October 24, 2018

Foursome is an American romantic comedy streaming television series starring Jenn McAllister and an ensemble cast of other social media entertainers and professional actors. The series was produced by AwesomenessTV and premiered on March 30, 2016, on YouTube Premium. The series lasted four seasons before airing its final episode on October 24, 2018.

== Plot ==
Andie is a sophomore in high school in San Bernardino who has trouble with dating, because her older brother Alec does not want her to date anyone. Andie's three best high school friends: Dakota, a high school senior, Courtney, Alec's girlfriend/college student and Imogen, Andie's homeschooled neighbors decide to help Andie with her dating problems, so Andie can freely go on dates without her brother stepping in to try and stop her.

== Cast ==
- Jenn McAllister as Andie Fixler
- Meghan Falcone as Courtney Todd (seasons 1–3; guest starring, season 4)
- Rickey Thompson as Dakota Green
- Brooke Markham as Imogen Hillenshine (seasons 1–2)
- Logan Paul as Alec Fixler (seasons 1–3)
- Cameron Moulène as Josh Bennett
- Rahart Adams as Kent Saydak (season 2–present)
- Madeline Whitby as Greer Ashton (main, season 2–present; recurring, season 1)
- Sarah Yarkin as Peg (season 3)
- Monica Sherer as Mae (main, season 3–present; recurring, seasons 1–2)
- John Milhiser as Mr. Shaw (main, season 3–present; recurring, seasons 1–2)
- Jared Wernick as Divit (season 3)
- Tucker Albrizzi as Terry (season 3)
- James Morosini as Hugh (season 4)
- Sarah Gilman as Wynn (season 4)
- Jesse Leigh as Rubin (season 4)

== Production ==
=== Development ===
In October 2015, YouTube announced YouTube Red, its paid subscription ad service that would offer subscribers an ad-free experience, which would also allow users to download videos for offline viewing. In addition, the service would be launching original content exclusive to YouTube Red subscribers in 2016.

On June 23, 2016, YouTube announced that "Foursome" was renewed for a second season. The first two episodes of the second season aired on December 6, 2016.

On May 1, 2017, AwesomenessTV announced that "Foursome" was renewed for a third season. The entire season was released on November 1, 2017. Logan Paul was removed from the upcoming fourth season on January 10, 2018, in the wake of a video Paul uploaded that attracted widespread criticism. The Alec Fixler role was completely written out without a replacement actor.

== Episodes ==
Season	Episodes	Originally released	
Season	Episodes	First released	Last released
1	6	March 30, 2016	April 27, 2016
2	10	December 6, 2016	February 1, 2017
3	10	November 1, 2017	
4	10	October 24, 2018	

=== Season 1 (2016) ===
With their father being gone, Andie has a tough time adjusting to her sophomore year of high school when her popular but overprotective and overbearing older brother watches her every move.

No. overall	No. in season	Title	Episode length	Original release date
1	1	"Sister-Zoned"	22:39	March 30, 2016
Like every 16-year-old girl, Andie Fixler is trying to land herself a boyfriend, however, has a challenge that most other girls don't have: an overprotective, overbearing sports jock older brother, Alec, watching her like a hawk. Andie bands with her three friends: Tiffany, a college student and Alec's girlfriend, Dakota, gay best friend, and Imogen, Andie's socially awkward next door neighbor, as they help Andie out of the sister-zone.
2	2	"Baked"	23:18	March 30, 2016
The foursome are forced to come up with topic of discussion for the school's TV news or risk losing the media room, but get caught in a situation that makes them question their self conscious
3	3	"Co-Ed Sleepover"	21:52	April 6, 2016
Boy Drama is nowhere in sight, and the foursome decides to celebrate with a girls night sleepover at Andie's house, however it leads to an epic showdown as it coincides with Alec's boys night, winner gets to stay at the house, while the loser stays outside.
4	4	"Sex-Ed"	23:26	April 13, 2016
After a failed condom lesson in health, it hits Andie that she knows nothing about sex, and turns to Courtney and Dakota for help.
5	5	"PDA"	23:16	April 20, 2016
Lust is in the air at Brayer high, and everyone is getting it, except Andie. Her friends try their best hide it from her, but abandon them during her time of need.
6	6	"Blackout"	24:03	April 27, 2016
Courtney invites the gang for a college party that ends in a major blackout, forcing them to piece together the night as Imogen turns up missing.

=== Season 2 (2016–17) ===
Weeks have passed since the college party, Andie tries adopt a new image as she navigates being single for the rest of the semester, however, curveballs are thrown in her direction that could ruin her new image.

No. overall	No. in season	Title	Episode length	Original release date
7	1	"Extra Curr-d*ck-ulars"	23:12	December 6, 2016
Three weeks after the party, Andie is ready to move on from the past and after an intrestinglesson in health class, Andie begins to execute a plan of her own "plan pheromone."
8	2	"Secret Admiral"	22:04	December 6, 2016
After receiving gifts from a secret admirer, Andie is happy, however she makes a shocking discovery. Dakota sense chemistry with his new science teacher.
9	3	"The Big O No!"	23:12	December 14, 2016
Andie begins to go on her own sensual journey as she tries to discover the big O. When a new British guy, Kent Saydak, transfers to Brayer, he becomes the talk of the school.
10	4	"After Shocker"	23:02	December 21, 2016
With no contact with the outside world after their phones were taken from them, the foursome are in dire need of help when a huge earthquake hits Los Angeles.
11	5	"Model UN-dressed"	22:56	December 28, 2016
Diplomacy fills the air as Imogen gives a new transfer student a tour of Brayer, and Andie makes Dakota join model UN to spend more time with Kent. When Kent and Andie team up for a presentation, negotiations get HOT.
12	6	"Threesome"	22:26	January 4, 2017
When Kent shows at the Fixler house, wires gets crossed. Courtney joins the bandwagon by dating herself.
13	7	"Les Be Honest"	22:42	January 11, 2017
After finding a spicy picture of Andie in Josh's locker, Geer hatches plan by hosting a fake sleepover with the girls to get answers. Meanwhile, Dakota decides to have boys night of his own in a asylum.
14	8	"Synced Up"	22:23	January 18, 2017
The girls get their scarlet wink at the same time and take a period day. The group boy-BANDS together to help each other get through the day and stay *NSYNC.
15	9	"Whatta Lock-Block"	22:09	January 25, 2017
Andie's excitement over going to her first Lock-In gets dimmed when Kent shows no interest in going to Homecoming. While the rest of the gang gets home-quiered, Courtney has a realization about her attachment to high school.
16	10	"The Big Finish"	23:04	February 1, 2017
Homecoming night arrives to Brayer high, but it doesn't go the way the foursome group plans it's filled with surprising confessions, lies, secrets, and sex

=== Season 3 (2017) ===
2 months has passed since the events of Homecoming Night, Brayer High has hit a major slump. With Imogen gone, the remaining foursome decide to vacation in a private resort island, that unfortunately has a bunch of strict rules that they are willing to break

No. overall	No. in season	Title	Episode length	Original release date
17	1	"Foursome Before Whoresome"	22:45	November 1, 2017
While Andie struggles to balance her buds with her new boy, the gang tries to woo her back with hot tix to BEACH ISLAND!
18	2	"Is that a Beach Bonanza in your Pocket, or Are You Just Happy to See Me?"	21:58	November 1, 2017
The Foursome settle in on Beach Island and try to score invites to the Beach Island Bikini Bonanza! But when Kent makes Andie lose her pukas, the gang have to find a way to nab Andie some beads back.
19	3	"Show Me Your Tikis"	21:16	November 1, 2017
20	4	"Scared Beach-Less"	22:59	November 1, 2017
21	5	"Ex-Isled"	21:28	November 1, 2017
22	6	"Island Fever"	22:52	November 1, 2017
23	7	"Laid in the Shade"	21:52	November 1, 2017
24	8	"Beach Bash-ed"	22:21	November 1, 2017
25	9	"Hypbrotized"	22:13	November 1, 2017
26	10	"Hanky Pranky"	22:54	November 1, 2017

=== Season 4 (2018) ===
Andie and Josh are finally together, but reality sets in as she realizes she has one final summer with friends and Josh as they head off to college next year, while she's stuck at Brayer for her junior year.

No. overall	No. in season	Title	Episode length	Original release date
27	1	"The Hot M.E.S.S."	23:37	October 24, 2018
After a turbulent year of ups and downs, Andie has finally got the guy and her friends, However, reality sets in as she will have to balance Josh and her friends over one summer as they head off to college next year, while she's stuck at Brayer for her junior year.
28	2	"The Fourth Season"	21:37	October 24, 2018
29	3	"Stay Linked - Get Inked"	22:36	October 24, 2018
30	4	"Discovering Hugh You Are"	22:08	October 24, 2018
31	5	"Be a Friend, Amend!"	23:12	October 24, 2018
32	6	"Applaud Yo Squad"	23:31	October 24, 2018
33	7	"Overnight Delight"	22:50	October 24, 2018
34	8	"Friend Yo Folks"	23:09	October 24, 2018
35	9	"Capture Your Capsule"	23:11	October 24, 2018
36	10	"Live As Legends"	23:33	October 24, 2018
As the summer winds down, so does Andie's time with her friends and Josh, and comes up with a plan to solidify her status as a legend by throwing a party at Brayer High.
