= Yuya (YouTuber) =

Mexican YouTuber

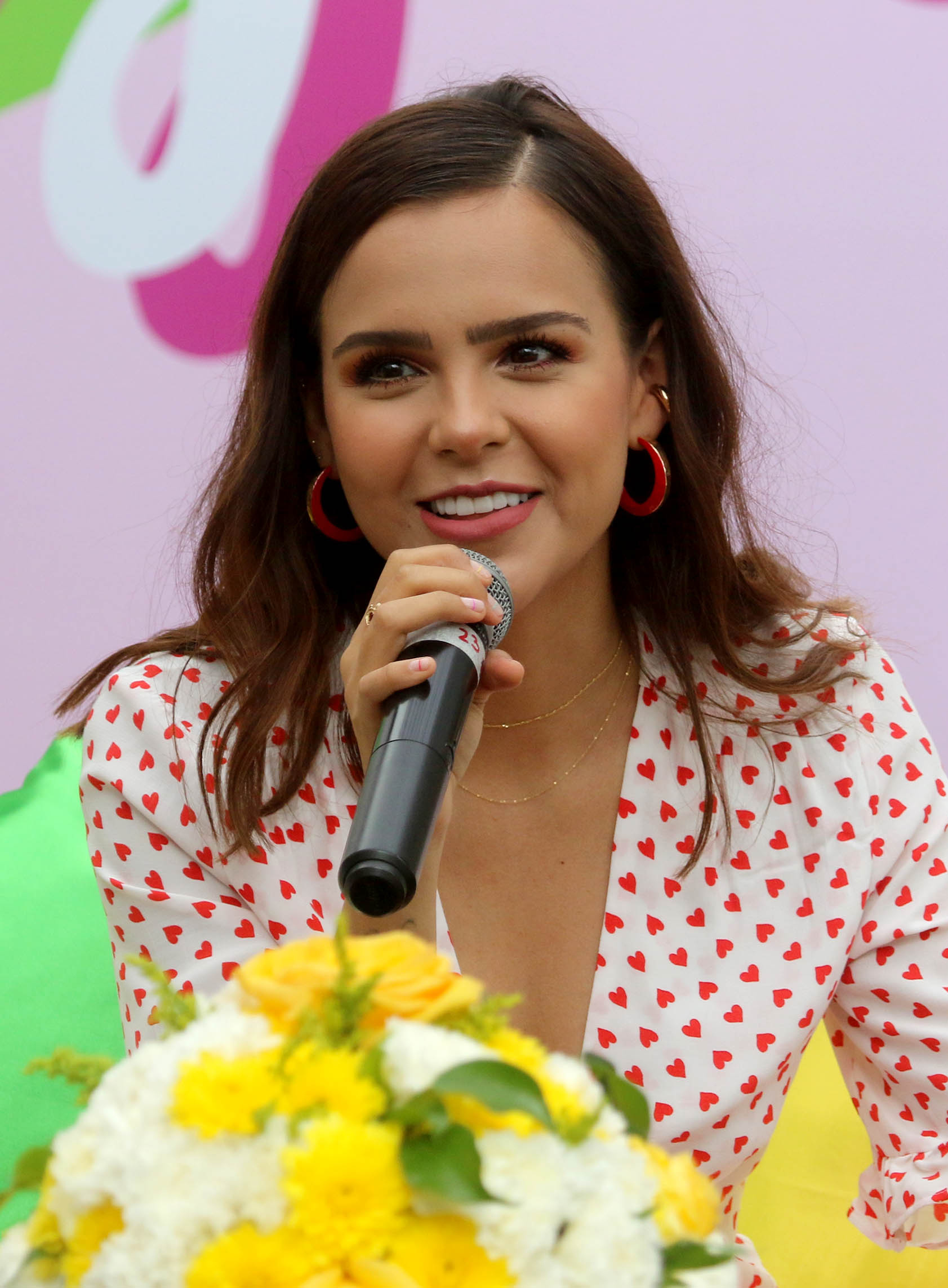
- Yuya in 2018
- Born: Mariand Castrejon Castañeda; March 13, 1993 (age 33); Cuernavaca, Morelos, Mexico
- Occupations: YouTuber; beauty vlogger; Empresaria

YouTube information
- Channel: Yuya
- Years active: 2009–present
- Genre: Beauty
- Subscribers: 24.5 million
- Views: 2.59 billion
- Last updated: 19/02/2026

Mariand Castrejón Castañeda (born March 13, 1993), better known as Yuya, is a Mexican beauty vlogger and YouTuber.

== Early life ==
Yuya was born in Cuernavaca, Morelos, Mexico. Her given name, Mariand, is a combination of her parents' names, Maribel and Andrés. She has a brother, Sergio, who also has a YouTube channel. Her uncle gave her the nickname Yuya after the Mexican TV character Yuya, la gorda.

== Career ==
Yuya created her YouTube channel, called "lady16makeup," in 2009 after winning a YouTube make-up contest when she was 16 years old.

In March 2016, she was one of seven female YouTube creators who joined the United Nations' Sustainable Development Action Campaign, aiming to "achieve gender equality and empower all women and girls."

Yuya has written two books: Los secretos de Yuya (2015) and Las confesiones de Yuya (2016). She released a perfume called #True in July 2015 and a makeup collection in October 2017.

== Personal life ==
She was in a relationship with Beto Pasillas, also a YouTuber, but broke up in June 2019. She started dating singer Siddhartha in August 2019. On June 12, 2021, Yuya announced she is pregnant via Instagram, and uploaded a video on her channel sharing her experience with pregnancy. On the September 2021, Siddhartha announced on Twitter that Yuya had given birth to their son Mar.

== Bibliography ==
- Los secretos de Yuya (1st edition). Mexico: Planeta. ISBN 978-607-07-2407-7
- Las confesiones de Yuya (1st edition). Mexico: Planeta. ISBN 978-607-07-2999-7
