= Rickey Thompson =

American actor (born 1996)

- Born: February 6, 1996 (age 30); Raleigh, North Carolina, U.S.
- Education: Millbrook High School
- Occupation: Actor
- Years active: 2013–present

Rickey Thompson (born February 6, 1996) is an American actor, comedian, and Internet personality. He rose to prominence for comedic videos he posts to Instagram, and previously Vine. Thompson starred in the YouTube Red series Foursome (2016-2018).

== Early life and career ==
Thompson grew up in Raleigh, North Carolina. He attended Millbrook High School, where he regularly performed in theater productions and was also bullied for being gay. During this time, Thompson posted YouTube videos about his experience with bullying as well as about fashion. He also used Vine to post comedic videos of himself, usually speaking directly to the camera.

When he was 17, Kylie Jenner shared one of his videos, which led to an increase in his profile on the platform. He amassed 2.5 million followers by the time Vine shut down in 2016. Thompson then began posting short videos to Instagram and continued to grow his social media following. He has monetized his videos with promotional posts and guest appearances at events and in other videos.

Thompson starred in the YouTube web series Foursome from 2016 to 2018.

In 2018, Thompson narrated several interludes for Aminé's album OnePointFive and also appeared in the "Reel It In" music video. Aminé sent Thompson a direct message on Instagram to invite him to be on the album. That December, he walked in his first runway show for designer Alexander Wang.

Thompson appeared in the 2022 stoner comedy Good Mourning with Machine Gun Kelly and Mod Sun.

He hosts the Spotify original podcast We Said What We Said with fellow internet personality Denzel Dion.

In 2024 he was featured on rapper Brooke Candy's album Candyland on the song "Juicy"

== Personal life ==
Thompson moved to Los Angeles after high school to pursue a career in the entertainment industry and decided to forego college. He also has great interest in fashion.

Thompson is gay. He came out on Twitter in 2016.

== Filmography ==
Year	Title	Role	Notes
2016	Betch	Stormy Dee Watson	Episode: "A Rickey Thompson Sketch Show"
2016–2018	Foursome	Dakota Green	Main role (29 episodes)
2016	Sleep Tight	Bobby	Episode: "Exorsitter"
2017	Mourners, Inc.	Tony	Episode: "Pilot"
2019	Trend or End with Rickey Thompson	Himself	
2022	Good Mourning	Workout Demon	
2023	Swarm	Kenny	Episode: "Girl, Bye"
2023	Savage X Fenty Show	Himself	Cameo
TBA	Princess	TBA	Post-production
