= Beauty YouTuber =

Beauty-related video creators on YouTube

A beauty YouTuber is an individual who creates content for YouTube, publishing videos in the realm of cosmetics, fashion, hairstyling, and nail art. In 2016, there were more than 5.3 million beauty videos on YouTube, with 86% of the top 200 beauty videos created by individual beauty vloggers, as opposed to marketers using the platform to promote cosmetic brands. Many beauty YouTubers also play a significant role in setting beauty trends, influencing, consumer behavior, and collaborating with major brands. As the beauty community on YouTube grew, it gave rise to influencers who used their platforms to launch personal product lines, advocate for inclusivity, and shape the standards of digital beauty culture.

== History ==
Beauty YouTubing dates back to the late 2000s, when video-sharing platforms began enabling users to upload and share makeup tutorials, product reviews, and personal beauty routines. One of the earliest and most influential figures in this space was Michelle Phan, whose 2009 "Barbie Transformation" video went viral and helped redefine how beauty content could be delivered online. Phan's approachable tone, DIY techniques, and consistent uploads helped her grow a large following, eventually leading to partnerships with major cosmetic brands and the founding of her own company, EM Cosmetics. Her trajectory demonstrated the power of social media in disrupting traditional beauty marketing and inspiring a new generation of creators. By the early 2010s, the rise of smartphones improves the video editing apps, and increased internet access helped fuel a global explosion of beauty content on YouTube. The platform became a launchpad for creators from diverse backgrounds to share techniques, promote products, and build personal brands. This shift not only changed how beauty was consumed but also transformed the influencer into a central figure in beauty culture.

== Background and industry trends ==
In 2015, there were more than 45,000 YouTube channels specializing in fashion and beauty-related content.

The number of popular beauty "mega influencers," a term used to depict an influencer with over 1 million views per month, started to increase, generating billions of views on beauty-related videos with an average of 700 million views per month in 2013.

The most common hashtags used on YouTube are #makeup and #skincare in beauty influencer content.

In both the United Kingdom and the United States, beauty vlogging is a rapidly growing industry.

== Global reach ==
Although the beauty YouTuber phenomenon began in the United States, it has since expanded globally. Creators like Yuya (Mexico), PONY Syndrome (South Korea), Shreya Jain (India), and Mari Maria (Brazil) have gained massive followings and helped shape regional beauty trends. These influencers often tailor their content to local audiences while still participating in global conversations about beauty.

== Impact ==
Beauty YouTubers provide viewers with life advice, beauty tips, personal stories, comedy, and fashion advice as a way to relate to their audience. With their content, cosmetic companies are provided feedback from both the beauty vlogger and their viewers on their products.

One of the most popular categories of video is “Get Ready With Me" (often shortened to the acronym "GRWM"). These videos are tutorials that demonstrate the beauty YouTuber's daily beauty routines as they get ready in the morning, prepare for an event, or get ready for sleep.

Scholars and critics have noted that “Get Ready With Me” (GRWM) videos created a hybrid genre that combines tutorial instruction with casual personal narration, encouraging parasocial intimacy between viewers and creators. GRWM-style content has been widely replicated across platforms such as TikTok and Instagram, where shorter iterations emphasize personal storytelling alongside product demonstration.

== Influence and economic impacts ==
Beauty YouTubers have played a major role in reshaping the beauty industry and influencing consumer behavior. Through product reviews, tutorials, and collaborations. These creators have become powerful marketing agents, usually referred to as "influencers", capable of driving product sales with a single video. According to Forbes, beauty influencers like Jeffree star and James Charles generate millions in income through ad revenue, brand partnerships, and product lines. James Charles' collaboration with Morphe, for example, resulted in one of the best selling makeup palettes in the company's history, selling out multiple times and generating millions of dollars in revenue.

A notable example of major economic impact is the 2019 collaboration between Shane Dawson and Jeffree Star, a multi-part YouTube documentary The Beautiful World of Jeffree Star. The series gained over 152 million views and drew huge audience engagement. When the "Conspiracy Collection" launched, the high demand temporarily crashed major e-commerce shopping sites, with reports of roughly two million users waiting in online queues during the launch. The event was described by several outlets as one of the biggest online product launches at the time, estimating about USD 35 million in revenue on the first release.

The economic influence of beauty YouTubers extends beyond just sales. Their ability to shape trends, spotlight indie brands, and redefine beauty norms gives them a unique position in both culture and marketing. Some creators have launched their own cosmetic lines, such as Huda Kattan with Huda Beauty, transitioning from content creators to CEO's. These shifts represent a new era in consumer-brand relationships, where authenticity and community engagement usually outweigh traditional advertising.

== Types of videos ==
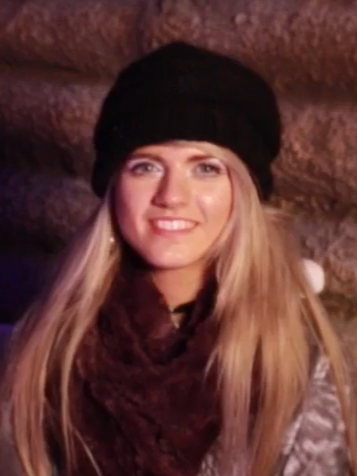
Outside of a 2016 scandal, the British YouTuber Marina Joyce (pictured) is best known for her makeup tutorials, which is popular type of beauty-related content.

Beauty-related content can be divided into specific subcategories in respect to its distinct features. These subcategories include but are not limited to:

- Tutorials which demonstrate the use of makeup or hair products.
  - Some tutorials, but not all, may be based on a specific theme (e.g. holidays, seasonal, etc.)
- Makeup routines for a specific look.
- "Get Ready With Me" videos.
- Fashion routine videos for a specific outfit, or "lookbooks".
- Favorites or haul videos, which discuss the vlogger's recently purchased or acquired makeup products.
  - Anti-hauls, which discuss the vlogger's dislike for certain makeup products.
- Product reviews for makeup and hair products.
- Commentary and gossip, colloquially referred to in the community as "tea" or "drama".
- Vlogs (video blogs).
- Q&A or "chit-chat" videos about the vlogger's personal life.
- Storytime and Lifestyle Vlog, videos that blend personal storytelling with beauty routines, offering audiences an emotional connection with creators.
- Educational Content, videos explaining skincare ingredients, color theory, or historical beauty trends. This subcategory appeals to viewers looking for scientific or academic insights.
- Product Launch Collaborations, announcements or tutorials tied to a creator's own product line or brand partnership. These often include exclusive coupon codes or discount links.

== Criticism and controversy ==
While beauty YouTubers have gained fame and influence, they have also faced criticism and public scrutiny. One major area of concern is transparency. Many influencers promote products without clearly disclosing paid partnerships or affiliate links, which has led to growing demands for clearer advertising standards. Additionally, controversies related to bullying, racism, and misinformation have become increasingly common. Feuds between high profile YouTubers such as Tati Westbrook, James Charles, and Jeffree Star, have gone viral and exposed the darker side of influencer culture.

Analysts have noted that some beauty influencers adopt "transparent marketing" strategies by showing behind-the-scenes footage, or even mentioning money and business decisions. Supporters of this approach say that being open about these challenges can help viewers feel more connected to the beauty influencers. The Shane Dawson and Jeffree Star "Conspiracy Collection" is one example often mentioned in these discussions. The Beautiful World of Jeffree Star series showed moments such as frustration with early product samples, issues during product launch, and details about how profits would be split. It blurred the line that influencers often choose what to show and what to hide, making the "transparency" be more of a marketing strategy than authenticity from them.

There is also ongoing criticism about the lack of diversity and representation in beauty content. Critics have pointed out the underrepresentation of creators of color and the way the algorithmic favoritism often promotes Eurocentric beauty standards. Influencers like Jackie Aina have used their platforms to call for inclusivity in product shade ranges and representation in campaigns. These conversations have led some brands to reevaluate their practices, but many argue that substantial change is still needed.

=== Controversies and cancel culture ===
The beauty Youtuber community has repeatedly been shaped by highly publicized controversies and cycles of audiences-led backlash often described as "cancel culture" . These events commonly involve allegations of racist or discriminatory remarks, failures of transparency regarding sponsorships and endorsements, interpersonal conflicts among creators, or other forms of allied misconduct. Accusations usually spread quickly across multiple platforms (YouTube, Twitter/X, Instagram and "tea"/drama channels), and public response have included mass unsubribing, calls for boycotts, and sustained critical commentary by audiences and other creators. A widely reported example occurred in May 2019 when a public dispute between two leading beauty creators prompted a cascade of videos, response posts, and rapid subscriber changes that became known in media as "Sistergeddon."

"Sistergeddon" is the colloquial term for the 2019 YouTube feud, or "Dramageddon 2.0," primarily involving beauty YouTubers Tati Westbrook and James Charles. The drama was ignited by Westbrook's viral video "BYE SISTER..." and involved other prominent YouTubers like Jeffree Star and Shane Dawson. The term refers to the widespread online conflict and its significant impact on the online drama landscape.

== Platform policies and monetization ==
Beauty YouTubers primarily earn income through a mix of YouTube AdSense, affiliate links, and brand sponsorships. However, YouTube's changing algorithm and monetization policies have impacted how creators make money and distribute content. Transparency around sponsorships is now more strictly enforced, with creators required to disclose paid content under advertising laws and platform guidelines.

== Notable beauty YouTubers ==
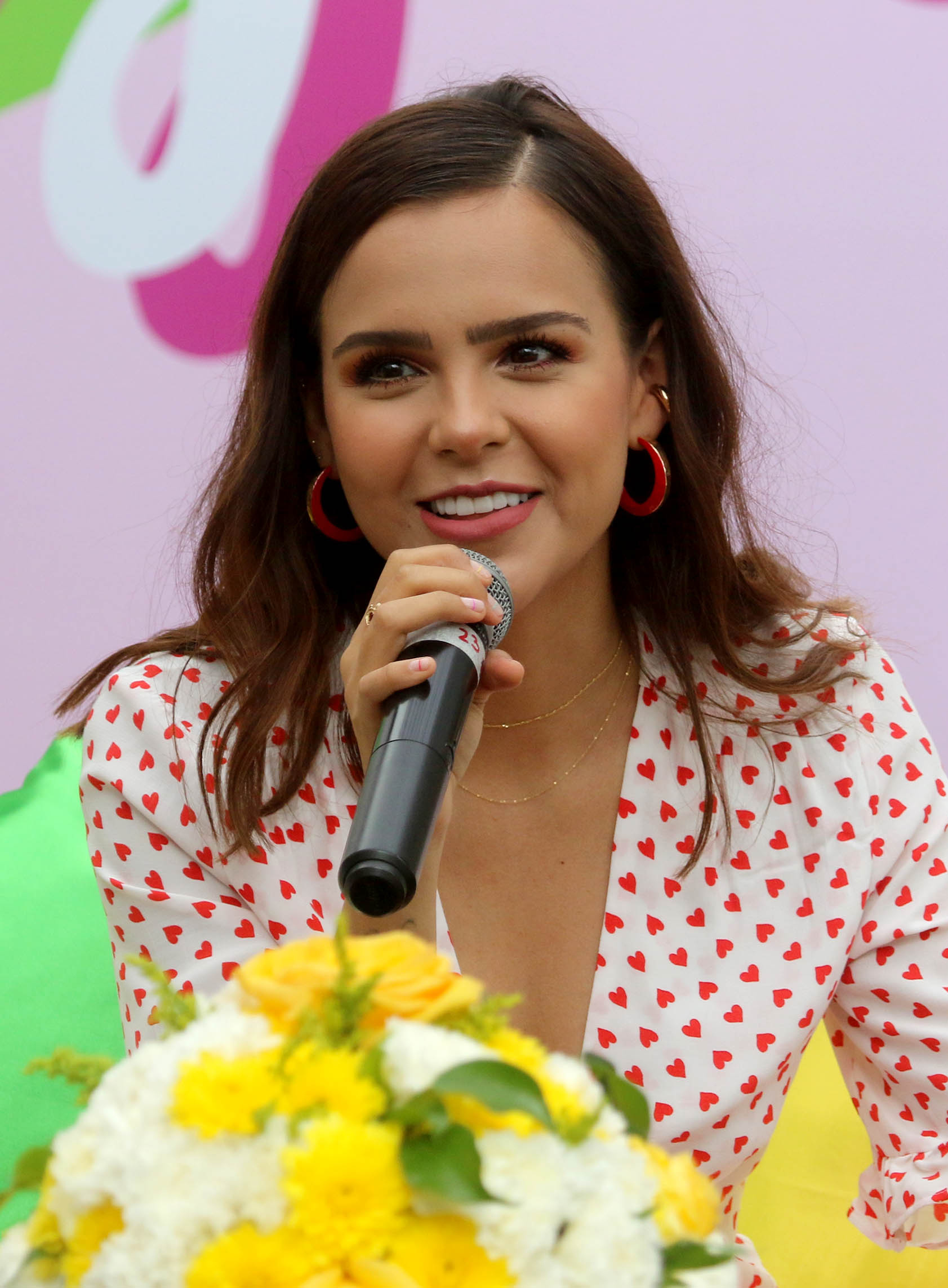
Yuya, the most-subscribed beauty YouTuber

The following table lists the beauty YouTubers with the most subscribers as of 2017.

Rank	Channel name	Country	Language	Subscribers (millions)
1.	Yuya	Mexico	Spanish	24.8
2.	James Charles	United States	English	23.9
3.	jeffreestar	United States	English	15.8
4.	NikkieTutorials	Netherlands/United States	English	14.3
5.	SaraBeautyCorner	Norway	English	10.6
6.	Mari Maria	Brazil	Portuguese	10.5
7.	Bethany Mota	United States	English	9.5
8.	Pautips	Colombia	Spanish	9.05
9.	Bretman Rock	Philippines/United States	English/Ilocano	8.86
10.	Michelle Phan	United States	English	8.69

The Shorty Awards have been honored several beauty YouTubers in the "YouTube Guru" category. Recipients of this award include British YouTuber Louise Pentland, popularly known as Sprinkle of Glitter, in 2016; NikkieTutorials in 2017 and James Charles in 2018.

== See also ==
- Beauty beggar
- Fashion influencer
- Instagram models
- List of YouTubers
- Outfit of the day
- YouTuber
